The following is a list of players of the 1997–present Washington Wizards professional American basketball team. Before the 1997-98 season the Wizards were known as the Chicago Packers (1961–1962), Chicago Zephyrs (1962–1963), Baltimore Bullets (1963–1973), Capital Bullets (1973–1974), and the Washington Bullets (1974–1997).



Players
Note: Statistics are correct through the end of the  season.

A to B
|-
|align="left"| || align="center"|F/C || align="left"|Oral Roberts || align="center"|1 ||  align="center"| || 12 || 246 || 61 || 5 || 58 || 20.5 || 5.1 || 0.4 || 4.8 || align=center|
|-
|align="left" bgcolor="#FFCC00"|+ || align="center"|G || align="left"|Boston College || align="center"|4 ||  align="center"|– || 281 || 8,934 || 856 || 1,844 || 3,745 || 31.8 || 3.0 || 6.6 || 13.3 || align=center|
|-
|align="left"| || align="center"|F || align="left"|Duke || align="center"|4 ||  align="center"|– || 261 || 4,390 || 906 || 289 || 1,929 || 16.8 || 3.5 || 1.1 || 7.4 || align=center|
|-
|align="left"| || align="center"|G || align="left"|Fresno State || align="center"|2 ||  align="center"|– || 83 || 2,235 || 228 || 127 || 1,007 || 26.9 || 2.7 || 1.5 || 12.1 || align=center|
|-
|align="left"| || align="center"|G || align="left"|Rice || align="center"|1 ||  align="center"| || 4 || 67 || 8 || 2 || 14 || 16.8 || 2.0 || 0.5 || 3.5 || align=center|
|-
|align="left"| || align="center"|F || align="left"|Southern Illinois || align="center"|1 ||  align="center"| || 31 || 144 || 52 || 3 || 40 || 4.6 || 1.7 || 0.1 || 1.3 || align=center|
|-
|align="left"| || align="center"|G/F || align="left"|Michigan State || align="center"|1 ||  align="center"| || 13 || 192 || 27 || 14 || 65 || 14.8 || 2.1 || 1.1 || 5.0 || align=center|
|-
|align="left"| || align="center"|G/F || align="left"|Fresno State || align="center"|1 ||  align="center"| || 10 || 180 || 27 || 11 || 52 || 18.0 || 2.7 || 1.1 || 5.2 || align=center|
|-
|align="left" bgcolor="#FFCC00"|+ || align="center"|G || align="left"|Arizona || align="center"|8 ||  align="center"|– || 357 || 14,049 || 1,513 || 2,046 || 8,930 || 39.4 || 4.2 || 5.7 || 25.0 || align=center|
|-
|align="left"| || align="center"|F || align="left"|UCLA || align="center"|3 ||  align="center"|– || 176 || 5,659 || 967 || 469 || 2,242 || 32.2 || 5.5 || 2.7 || 12.7 || align=center|
|-
|align="left"| || align="center"|F/C || align="left"|UConn || align="center"|1 ||  align="center"| || 41 || 412 || 114 || 10 || 77 || 10.0 || 2.8 || 0.2 || 1.9 || align=center|
|-
|align="left"| || align="center"|G || align="left"|South Florida || align="center"|1 ||  align="center"| || 28 || 552 || 45 || 69 || 187 || 19.7 || 1.6 || 2.5 || 6.7 || align=center|
|-
|align="left"| || align="center"|C || align="left"|Arizona State || align="center"|1 ||  align="center"| || 59 || 1,173 || 282 || 74 || 397 || 19.9 || 4.8 || 1.3 || 6.7 || align=center|
|-
|align="left"| || align="center"|G || align="left"|Boston College || align="center"|1 ||  align="center"| || 4 || 61 || 7 || 4 || 23 || 15.3 || 1.8 || 1.0 || 5.8 || align=center|
|-
|align="left"| || align="center"|G/F || align="left"|UTEP || align="center"|1 ||  align="center"| || 20 || 180 || 28 || 26 || 38 || 9.0 || 1.4 || 1.3 || 1.9 || align=center|
|-
|align="left"| || align="center"|G || align="left"|Wichita State || align="center"|1 ||  align="center"| || 4 || 45 || 4 || 2 || 0 || 11.3 || 1.0 || 0.5 || 0.0 || align=center|
|-
|align="left"| || align="center"|F || align="left"|Oregon || align="center"|8 ||  align="center"|– || 643 || 18,687 || 4,094 || 1,542 || 8,706 || 29.1 || 6.4 || 2.4 || 13.5 || align=center|
|-
|align="left"| || align="center"|F/C || align="left"|UTEP || align="center"|2 ||  align="center"| || 77 || 2,028 || 699 || 93 || 835 || 26.3 || 9.1 || 1.2 || 10.8 || align=center|
|-
|align="left"| || align="center"|G || align="left"|Tennessee State || align="center"|2 ||  align="center"| || 83 || 1,718 || 210 || 207 || 631 || 20.7 || 2.5 || 2.5 || 7.6 || align=center|
|-
|align="left"| || align="center"|C || align="left"|Memphis || align="center"|1 ||  align="center"| || 11 || 122 || 43 || 3 || 28 || 11.1 || 3.9 || 0.3 || 2.5 || align=center|
|-
|align="left"| || align="center"|G || align="left"|Kentucky State || align="center"|1 ||  align="center"| || 15 || 277 || 18 || 14 || 118 || 18.5 || 1.2 || 0.9 || 7.9 || align=center|
|-
|align="left"| || align="center"|C || align="left"|Notre Dame || align="center"|1 ||  align="center"| || 54 || 558 || 119 || 29 || 178 || 10.3 || 2.2 || 0.5 || 3.3 || align=center|
|-
|align="left"| || align="center"|F || align="left"|Maryland || align="center"|1 ||  align="center"| || 12 || 132 || 31 || 5 || 41 || 11.0 || 2.6 || 0.4 || 3.4 || align=center|
|-
|align="left" bgcolor="#FBCEB1"|* || align="center"|G || align="left"|Florida || align="center"|7 ||  align="center"|– || 488 || 16,779 || 1,927 || 1,824 || 9,684 || 34.4 || 3.9 || 3.7 || 19.8 || align=center|
|-
|align="left"| || align="center"|F/C || align="left"|Minnesota || align="center"|1 ||  align="center"| || 6 || 64 || 14 || 7 || 23 || 10.7 || 2.3 || 1.2 || 3.8 || align=center|
|-
|align="left" bgcolor="#FFFF99"|^ || align="center"|C || align="left"|Indiana || align="center"|5 ||  align="center"|– || 327 || 13,613 || 5,438 || 778 || 9,020 || bgcolor="#CFECEC"|41.6 || bgcolor="#CFECEC"|16.6 || 2.4 || bgcolor="#CFECEC"|27.6 || align=center|
|-
|align="left"| || align="center"|G || align="left"|Arizona || align="center"|1 ||  align="center"| || 2 || 29 || 3 || 8 || 2 || 14.5 || 1.5 || 4.0 || 1.0 || align=center|
|-
|align="left" bgcolor="#FFFF99"|^ || align="center"|G || align="left"|Syracuse || align="center"|2 ||  align="center"|– || 146 || 4,461 || 380 || 767 || 2,004 || 30.6 || 2.6 || 5.3 || 13.7 || align=center|
|-
|align="left"| || align="center"|F/C || align="left"|Pittsburgh || align="center"|2 ||  align="center"|– || 58 || 398 || 113 || 14 || 117 || 6.9 || 1.9 || 0.2 || 2.0 || align=center|
|-
|align="left"| || align="center"|G || align="left"|Maryland || align="center"|2 ||  align="center"|– || 119 || 2,040 || 188 || 278 || 635 || 17.1 || 1.6 || 2.3 || 5.3 || align=center|
|-
|align="left"| || align="center"|F || align="left"|South Kent School (CT) || align="center"|7 ||  align="center"|– || 409 || 9,289 || 2,217 || 601 || 4,042 || 22.7 || 5.4 || 1.5 || 9.9 || align=center|
|-
|align="left"| || align="center"|G/F || align="left"|Croatia || align="center"|1 ||  align="center"| || 26 || 601 || 80 || 21 || 330 || 23.1 || 3.1 || 0.8 || 12.7 || align=center|
|-
|align="left"| || align="center"|G || align="left"|Wake Forest || align="center"|1 ||  align="center"| || 79 || 1,628 || 136 || 404 || 393 || 20.6 || 1.7 || 5.1 || 5.0 || align=center|
|-
|align="left"| || align="center"|F || align="left"|Auburn Montgomery || align="center"|1 ||  align="center"| || 2 || 4 || 0 || 0 || 0 || 2.0 || 0.0 || 0.0 || 0.0 || align=center|
|-
|align="left"| || align="center"|C || align="left"|Bridgeport || align="center"|4 ||  align="center"|– || 241 || 4,784 || 1,115 || 48 || 725 || 19.9 || 4.6 || 0.2 || 3.0 || align=center|
|-
|align="left"| || align="center"|F || align="left"|Illinois || align="center"|1 ||  align="center"| || 3 || 9 || 2 || 0 || 4 || 3.0 || 0.7 || 0.0 || 1.3 || align=center|
|-
|align="left"| || align="center"|F || align="left"|Clemson || align="center"|4 ||  align="center"|– || 235 || 4,764 || 1,194 || 179 || 1,512 || 20.3 || 5.1 || 0.8 || 6.4 || align=center|
|-
|align="left"| || align="center"|C || align="left"|Penn State || align="center"|4 ||  align="center"|–– || 128 || 1,413 || 339 || 60 || 338 || 11.0 || 2.6 || 0.5 || 2.6 || align=center|
|-
|align="left"| || align="center"|F || align="left"|Maryland || align="center"|1 ||  align="center"| || 13 || 125 || 39 || 2 || 56 || 9.6 || 3.0 || 0.2 || 4.3 || align=center|
|-
|align="left"| || align="center"|G || align="left"|Eastern Michigan || align="center"|1 ||  align="center"| || 67 || 1,117 || 75 || 171 || 440 || 16.7 || 1.1 || 2.6 || 6.6 || align=center|
|-
|align="left"| || align="center"|F || align="left"|Ohio State || align="center"|2 ||  align="center"|– || 44 || 350 || 92 || 20 || 144 || 8.0 || 2.1 || 0.5 || 3.3 || align=center|
|-
|align="left"| || align="center"|G/F || align="left"|North Carolina || align="center"|2 ||  align="center"|– || 143 || 2,074 || 229 || 280 || 553 || 14.5 || 1.6 || 2.0 || 3.9 || align=center|
|-
|align="left"| || align="center"|F || align="left"|Xavier || align="center"|1 ||  align="center"| || 4 || 22 || 5 || 1 || 6 || 5.5 || 1.3 || 0.3 || 1.5 || align=center|
|-
|align="left"| || align="center"|G || align="left"|Texas A&M || align="center"|1 ||  align="center"| || 2 || 9 || 2 || 3 || 4 || 4.5 || 1.0 || 1.5 || 2.0 || align=center|
|-
|align="left"| || align="center"|F || align="left"|Syracuse || align="center"|1 ||  align="center"| || 14 || 152 || 28 || 14 || 54 || 10.9 || 2.0 || 1.0 || 3.9 || align=center|
|-
|align="left"| || align="center"|G || align="left"|Illinois || align="center"|1 ||  align="center"| || 17 || 233 || 28 || 33 || 41 || 13.7 || 1.6 || 1.9 || 2.4 || align=center|
|-
|align="left"| || align="center"|F || align="left"|Glynn Academy (GA) || align="center"|4 ||  align="center"|– || 253 || 5,737 || 1,380 || 252 || 1,948 || 22.7 || 5.5 || 1.0 || 7.7 || align=center|
|-
|align="left"| || align="center"|C || align="left"|UNLV || align="center"|1 ||  align="center"| || 2 || 5 || 2 || 0 || 2 || 2.5 || 1.0 || 0.0 || 1.0 || align=center|
|-
|align="left" bgcolor="#CCFFCC"|x || align="center"|G/F || align="left"|Oregon || align="center"|1 ||  align="center"| || 52 || 730 || 145 || 80 || 248 || 14.0 || 2.8 || 1.5 || 4.8 || align=center|
|-
|align="left" bgcolor="#CCFFCC"|x || align="center"|C || align="left"|Indiana || align="center"|1 ||  align="center"| || 72 || 1,496 || 454 || 92 || 758 || 20.8 || 6.3 || 1.3 || 10.5 || align=center|
|-
|align="left"| || align="center"|G || align="left"|Michigan || align="center"|1 ||  align="center"| || 57 || 703 || 47 || 100 || 285 || 12.3 || 0.8 || 1.8 || 5.0 || align=center|
|-
|align="left"| || align="center"|G || align="left"|Iona || align="center"|1 ||  align="center"| || 4 || 35 || 3 || 6 || 29 || 8.8 || 0.8 || 1.5 || 7.3 || align=center|
|-
|align="left"| || align="center"|G || align="left"|Niagara || align="center"|1 ||  align="center"| || 25 || 172 || 21 || 12 || 59 || 6.9 || 0.8 || 0.5 || 2.4 || align=center|
|-
|align="left" bgcolor="#FFCC00"|+ || align="center"|F || align="left"|UConn || align="center"|5 ||  align="center"|– || 310 || 11,934 || 2,051 || 1,100 || 5,889 || 38.5 || 6.6 || 3.5 || 19.0 || align=center|
|-
|align="left"| || align="center"|G/F || align="left"|UCLA || align="center"|4 ||  align="center"|– || 253 || 4,285 || 584 || 267 || 1,486 || 16.9 || 2.3 || 1.1 || 5.9 || align=center|
|-
|align="left"| || align="center"|G/F || align="left"|La Salle || align="center"|1 ||  align="center"| || 75 || 1,505 || 197 || 63 || 580 || 20.1 || 2.6 || 0.8 || 7.7 || align=center|
|-
|align="left"| || align="center"|G || align="left"|Georgia Tech || align="center"|1 ||  align="center"| || 7 || 67 || 6 || 18 || 22 || 9.6 || 0.9 || 2.6 || 3.1 || align=center|
|}

C
|-
|align="left"| || align="center"|F || align="left"|Bradley || align="center"|3 ||  align="center"|– || 105 || 2,164 || 493 || 119 || 619 || 20.6 || 4.7 || 1.1 || 5.9 || align=center|
|-
|align="left"| || align="center"|F || align="left"|Purdue || align="center"|1 ||  align="center"| || 5 || 15 || 5 || 1 || 4 || 3.0 || 1.0 || 0.2 || 0.8 || align=center|
|-
|align="left"| || align="center"|G || align="left"|DePaul || align="center"|1 ||  align="center"| || 31 || 382 || 39 || 57 || 170 || 12.3 || 1.3 || 1.8 || 5.5 || align=center|
|-
|align="left"| || align="center"|G || align="left"|Notre Dame || align="center"|1 ||  align="center"| || 39 || 580 || 52 || 49 || 192 || 14.9 || 1.3 || 1.3 || 4.9 || align=center|
|-
|align="left"| || align="center"|G/F || align="left"|Mount St. Mary's || align="center"|3 ||  align="center"|– || 155 || 2,994 || 462 || 298 || 1,208 || 19.3 || 3.0 || 1.9 || 7.8 || align=center|
|-
|align="left"| || align="center"|F || align="left"|South Alabama || align="center"|3 ||  align="center"|– || 227 || 5,836 || 1,529 || 194 || 2,593 || 25.7 || 6.7 || 0.9 || 11.4 || align=center|
|-
|align="left"| || align="center"|G || align="left"|Kentucky || align="center"|4 ||  align="center"|– || 166 || 4,815 || 351 || 432 || 2,584 || 29.0 || 2.1 || 2.6 || 15.6 || align=center|
|-
|align="left"| || align="center"|G/F || align="left"|Indiana || align="center"|6 ||  align="center"|– || 424 || 13,097 || 1,483 || 817 || 5,399 || 30.9 || 3.5 || 1.9 || 12.7 || align=center|
|-
|align="left" bgcolor="#FFCC00"|+ (#45) || align="center"|G || align="left"|California || align="center"|9 ||  align="center"|– || 546 || 18,654 || 2,020 || 1,688 || 9,778 || 34.2 || 3.7 || 3.1 || 17.9 || align=center|
|-
|align="left"| || align="center"|F/C || align="left"|Marquette || align="center"|1 ||  align="center"| || 59 || 867 || 185 || 64 || 184 || 14.7 || 3.1 || 1.1 || 3.1 || align=center|
|-
|align="left" bgcolor="#FFCC00"|+ || align="center"|G || align="left"|Minnesota || align="center"|3 ||  align="center"|– || 171 || 6,506 || 535 || 1,166 || 3,357 || 38.0 || 3.1 || 6.8 || 19.6 || align=center|
|-
|align="left"| || align="center"|G || align="left"|Ohio State || align="center"|1 ||  align="center"| || 57 || 1,535 || 133 || 248 || 444 || 26.9 || 2.3 || 4.4 || 7.8 || align=center|
|-
|align="left"| || align="center"|C || align="left"|Boise State || align="center"|1 ||  align="center"| || 14 || 98 || 22 || 0 || 31 || 7.0 || 1.6 || 0.0 || 2.2 || align=center|
|-
|align="left"| || align="center"|G/F || align="left"|Washington State || align="center"|4 ||  align="center"|– || 189 || 3,936 || 506 || 362 || 1,921 || 20.8 || 2.7 || 1.9 || 10.2 || align=center|
|-
|align="left"| || align="center"|C || align="left"|Stanford || align="center"|1 ||  align="center"| || 6 || 54 || 8 || 2 || 4 || 9.0 || 1.3 || 0.3 || 0.7 || align=center|
|-
|align="left"| || align="center"|G || align="left"|New Mexico State || align="center"|3 ||  align="center"|– || 209 || 3,763 || 513 || 608 || 1,342 || 18.0 || 2.5 || 2.9 || 6.4 || align=center|
|-
|align="left"| || align="center"|G || align="left"|Kansas State || align="center"|1 ||  align="center"| || 12 || 89 || 19 || 12 || 25 || 7.4 || 1.6 || 1.0 || 2.1 || align=center|
|-
|align="left"| || align="center"|F/C || align="left"|Providence || align="center"|1 ||  align="center"| || 14 || 201 || 50 || 6 || 70 || 14.4 || 3.6 || 0.4 || 5.0 || align=center|
|-
|align="left"| || align="center"|F || align="left"|Illinois || align="center"|1 ||  align="center"| || 16 || 155 || 40 || 8 || 50 || 9.7 || 2.5 || 0.5 || 3.1 || align=center|
|-
|align="left"| || align="center"|G || align="left"|Portland || align="center"|1 ||  align="center"| || 82 || 1,420 || 145 || 151 || 614 || 17.3 || 1.8 || 1.8 || 7.5 || align=center|
|-
|align="left"| || align="center"|F/C || align="left"|Colorado || align="center"|1 ||  align="center"| || 5 || 47 || 13 || 2 || 15 || 9.4 || 2.6 || 0.4 || 3.0 || align=center|
|-
|align="left"| || align="center"|G || align="left"|NC State || align="center"|1 ||  align="center"| || 1 || 3 || 0 || 0 || 2 || 3.0 || 0.0 || 0.0 || 2.0 || align=center|
|-
|align="left"| || align="center"|C || align="left"|DePaul || align="center"|2 ||  align="center"|– || 137 || 1,358 || 417 || 112 || 400 || 9.9 || 3.0 || 0.8 || 2.9 || align=center|
|-
|align="left"| || align="center"|F/C || align="left"|Oregon State || align="center"|1 ||  align="center"| || 25 || 343 || 155 || 30 || 159 || 13.7 || 6.2 || 1.2 || 6.4 || align=center|
|-
|align="left"| || align="center"|G || align="left"|San Francisco || align="center"|1 ||  align="center"| || 7 || 78 || 10 || 6 || 29 || 11.1 || 1.4 || 0.9 || 4.1 || align=center|
|-
|align="left"| || align="center"|G || align="left"|Kentucky || align="center"|1 ||  align="center"| || 73 || 1,685 || 280 || 142 || 573 || 23.1 || 3.8 || 1.9 || 7.8 || align=center|
|-
|align="left"| || align="center"|G || align="left"|Xavier || align="center"|3 ||  align="center"|– || 133 || 3,747 || 380 || 449 || 1,929 || 28.2 || 2.9 || 3.4 || 14.5 || align=center|
|-
|align="left"| || align="center"|G || align="left"|Georgia Tech || align="center"|1 ||  align="center"| || 56 || 1,130 || 160 || 145 || 298 || 20.2 || 2.9 || 2.6 || 5.3 || align=center|
|-
|align="left"| || align="center"|G/F || align="left"|Georgia Southern || align="center"|1 ||  align="center"| || 5 || 34 || 5 || 1 || 10 || 6.8 || 1.0 || 0.2 || 2.0 || align=center|
|}

D to E
|-
|align="left" bgcolor="#FFCC00"|+ || align="center"|G/F || align="left"|Norfolk State || align="center"|4 ||  align="center"|– || 221 || 7,408 || 1,218 || 890 || 4,052 || 33.5 || 5.5 || 4.0 || 18.3 || align=center|
|-
|align="left"| || align="center"|G || align="left"|Bowling Green || align="center"|4 ||  align="center"|– || 244 || 6,493 || 548 || 961 || 2,001 || 26.6 || 2.2 || 3.9 || 8.2 || align=center|
|-
|align="left"| || align="center"|F || align="left"|Vanderbilt || align="center"|4 ||  align="center"|– || 178 || 2,231 || 453 || 135 || 1,004 || 12.5 || 2.5 || 0.8 || 5.6 || align=center|
|-
|align="left"| || align="center"|G || align="left"|North Carolina || align="center"|2 ||  align="center"|– || 66 || 1,662 || 107 || 156 || 518 || 25.2 || 1.6 || 2.4 || 7.8 || align=center|
|-
|align="left"| || align="center"|G || align="left"|Virginia Union || align="center"|2 ||  align="center"| || 69 || 1,613 || 163 || 130 || 792 || 23.4 || 2.4 || 1.9 || 11.5 || align=center|
|-
|align="left"| || align="center"|C || align="left"|Michigan State || align="center"|1 ||  align="center"| || 2 || 8 || 0 || 3 || 5 || 4.0 || 0.0 || 1.5 || 2.5 || align=center|
|-
|align="left"| || align="center"|G || align="left"|Cincinnati || align="center"|1 ||  align="center"| || 77 || 1,992 || 162 || 247 || 799 || 25.9 || 2.1 || 3.2 || 10.4 || align=center|
|-
|align="left"| || align="center"|F/C || align="left"|Virginia Union || align="center"|2 ||  align="center"|– || 111 || 2,283 || 619 || 40 || 449 || 20.6 || 5.6 || 0.4 || 4.0 || align=center|
|-
|align="left"| || align="center"|G/F || align="left"|UCLA || align="center"|3 ||  align="center"|– || 219 || 3,822 || 643 || 525 || 1,706 || 17.5 || 2.9 || 2.4 || 7.8 || align=center|
|-
|align="left"| || align="center"|F/C || align="left"|Indiana || align="center"|1 ||  align="center"| || 13 ||  ||  ||  ||  || 0.0 || 0.0 || 0.0 || 0.0 || align=center|
|-
|align="left"| || align="center"|F || align="left"|Wisconsin || align="center"|1 ||  align="center"| || 38 || 619 || 115 || 37 || 230 || 16.3 || 3.0 || 1.0 || 6.1 || align=center|
|-
|align="left" bgcolor="#FFCC00"|+ || align="center"|G/F || align="left"|Purdue || align="center"|2 ||  align="center"|– || 137 || 5,110 || 1,125 || 332 || 3,114 || 37.3 || 8.2 || 2.4 || 22.7 || align=center|
|-
|align="left"| || align="center"|G || align="left"|Maryland || align="center"|4 ||  align="center"|– || 226 || 3,995 || 406 || 406 || 1,702 || 17.7 || 1.8 || 1.8 || 7.5 || align=center|
|-
|align="left"| || align="center"|F || align="left"|Boston College || align="center"|2 ||  align="center"|– || 41 || 318 || 112 || 23 || 107 || 7.8 || 2.7 || 0.6 || 2.6 || align=center|
|-
|align="left"| || align="center"|C || align="left"|Eastern Illinois || align="center"|2 ||  align="center"|– || 109 || 2,303 || 520 || 76 || 739 || 21.1 || 4.8 || 0.7 || 6.8 || align=center|
|-
|align="left"| || align="center"|G/F || align="left"|Boston College || align="center"|1 ||  align="center"| || 81 || 2,098 || 286 || 170 || 638 || 25.9 || 3.5 || 2.1 || 7.9 || align=center|
|-
|align="left"| || align="center"|G || align="left"|Syracuse || align="center"|1 ||  align="center"| || 37 || 137 || 23 || 14 || 60 || 3.7 || 0.6 || 0.4 || 1.6 || align=center|
|-
|align="left"| || align="center"|G/F || align="left"|New Orleans || align="center"|6 ||  align="center"|– || 387 || 8,019 || 884 || 668 || 4,388 || 20.7 || 2.3 || 1.7 || 11.3 || align=center|
|-
|align="left"| || align="center"|G/F || align="left"|Virginia Tech || align="center"|1 ||  align="center"| || 26 || 147 || 23 || 5 || 63 || 5.7 || 0.9 || 0.2 || 2.4 || align=center|
|-
|align="left"| || align="center"|G || align="left"|Providence || align="center"|3 ||  align="center"|– || 207 || 4,259 || 473 || 668 || 1,861 || 20.6 || 2.3 || 3.2 || 9.0 || align=center|
|-
|align="left"| || align="center"|F/C || align="left"|Maryland || align="center"|1 ||  align="center"| || 29 || 273 || 76 || 9 || 101 || 9.4 || 2.6 || 0.3 || 3.5 || align=center|
|-
|align="left"| || align="center"|F/C || align="left"|St. John's || align="center"|4 ||  align="center"|– || 311 || 8,423 || 2,718 || 448 || 3,219 || 27.1 || 8.7 || 1.4 || 10.4 || align=center|
|-
|align="left"| || align="center"|F/C || align="left"|Louisville || align="center"|4 ||  align="center"|– || 238 || 7,332 || 2,000 || 479 || 3,309 || 30.8 || 8.4 || 2.0 || 13.9 || align=center|
|-
|align="left"| || align="center"|G || align="left"|Virginia Union || align="center"|2 ||  align="center"|– || 151 || 3,108 || 315 || 320 || 1,502 || 20.6 || 2.1 || 2.1 || 9.9 || align=center|
|-
|align="left"| || align="center"|G || align="left"|Texas || align="center"|2 ||  align="center"|– || 50 || 1,055 || 96 || 24 || 368 || 21.1 || 1.9 || 0.5 || 7.4 || align=center|
|}

F to G
|-
|align="left"| || align="center"|C || align="left"|UTEP || align="center"|1 ||  align="center"| || 57 || 828 || 202 || 36 || 286 || 14.5 || 3.5 || 0.6 || 5.0 || align=center|
|-
|align="left"| || align="center"|G/F || align="left"|Michigan State || align="center"|1 ||  align="center"| || 18 || 138 || 12 || 14 || 38 || 7.7 || 0.7 || 0.8 || 2.1 || align=center|
|-
|align="left"| || align="center"|F/C || align="left"|Saint Louis || align="center"|5 ||  align="center"|– || 260 || 4,377 || 1,142 || 328 || 1,565 || 16.8 || 4.4 || 1.3 || 6.0 || align=center|
|-
|align="left"| || align="center"|C || align="left"|UNC Wilmington || align="center"|1 ||  align="center"| || 5 || 7 || 5 || 0 || 2 || 1.4 || 1.0 || 0.0 || 0.4 || align=center|
|-
|align="left"| || align="center"|F/C || align="left"|UTEP || align="center"|3 ||  align="center"|– || 113 || 1,247 || 323 || 83 || 473 || 11.0 || 2.9 || 0.7 || 4.2 || align=center|
|-
|align="left"| || align="center"|G || align="left"|Villanova || align="center"|1 ||  align="center"| || 70 || 1,667 || 130 || 228 || 704 || 23.8 || 1.9 || 3.3 || 10.1 || align=center|
|-
|align="left"| || align="center"|G || align="left"|Penn State || align="center"|1 ||  align="center"| || 59 || 838 || 115 || 194 || 176 || 14.2 || 1.9 || 3.3 || 3.0 || align=center|
|-
|align="left"| || align="center"|G || align="left"|Seton Hall || align="center"|1 ||  align="center"| || 7 || 70 || 7 || 5 || 22 || 10.0 || 1.0 || 0.7 || 3.1 || align=center|
|-
|align="left"| || align="center"|G || align="left"|Alabama || align="center"|2 ||  align="center"|– || 22 || 309 || 55 || 12 || 113 || 14.0 || 2.5 || 0.5 || 5.1 || align=center|
|-
|align="left"| || align="center"|G/F || align="left"|UTEP || align="center"|1 ||  align="center"| || 59 || 424 || 61 || 19 || 196 || 7.2 || 1.0 || 0.3 || 3.3 || align=center|
|-
|align="left"| || align="center"|F || align="left"|USC Upstate || align="center"|1 ||  align="center"| || 32 || 229 || 66 || 9 || 53 || 7.2 || 2.1 || 0.3 || 1.7 || align=center|
|-
|align="left"| || align="center"|G || align="left"|Houston || align="center"|1 ||  align="center"| || 5 || 34 || 3 || 1 || 13 || 6.8 || 0.6 || 0.2 || 2.6 || align=center|
|-
|align="left"| || align="center"|F || align="left"|Kansas || align="center"|3 ||  align="center"|– || 103 || 1,564 || 422 || 77 || 542 || 15.2 || 4.1 || 0.7 || 5.3 || align=center|
|-
|align="left"| || align="center"|F/C || align="left"|Poland || align="center"|5 ||  align="center"|– || 402 || 11,995 || 3,697 || 613 || 4,654 || 29.8 || 9.2 || 1.5 || 11.6 || align=center|
|-
|align="left"| || align="center"|F/C || align="left"|Roberto Clemente HS (IL) || align="center"|1 ||  align="center"| || 12 ||  ||  ||  ||  ||  ||  ||  ||  || align=center|
|-
|align="left"| || align="center"|G || align="left"|TCNJ || align="center"|1 ||  align="center"| || 10 || 138 || 6 || 23 || 24 || 13.8 || 0.6 || 2.3 || 2.4 || align=center|
|-
|align="left"| || align="center"|F || align="left"|Oklahoma || align="center"|7 ||  align="center"|–– || 508 || 13,435 || 2,330 || 896 || 5,445 || 26.4 || 4.6 || 1.8 || 10.7 || align=center|
|-
|align="left"| || align="center"|F || align="left"|Long Beach State || align="center"|1 ||  align="center"| || 58 || 996 || 186 || 69 || 347 || 17.2 || 3.2 || 1.2 || 6.0 || align=center|
|-
|align="left"| || align="center"|F || align="left"|Georgetown || align="center"|1 ||  align="center"| || 77 || 2,097 || 309 || 137 || 946 || 27.2 || 4.0 || 1.8 || 12.3 || align=center|
|-
|align="left"| || align="center"|F/C || align="left"|Michigan State || align="center"|2 ||  align="center"|– || 133 || 2,385 || 965 || 153 || 1,319 || 17.9 || 7.3 || 1.2 || 9.9 || align=center|
|-
|align="left"| || align="center"|F || align="left"|Wake Forest || align="center"|1 ||  align="center"| || 20 || 221 || 38 || 3 || 109 || 11.1 || 1.9 || 0.2 || 5.5 || align=center|
|-
|align="left"| || align="center"|G/F || align="left"|Duquesne || align="center"|4 ||  align="center"|– || 275 || 5,798 || 786 || 777 || 2,030 || 26.6 || 3.6 || 3.6 || 7.4 || align=center|
|-
|align="left"| || align="center"|F || align="left"|Wisconsin || align="center"|1 ||  align="center"| || 2 || 2 || 2 || 0 || 2 || 1.0 || 1.0 || 0.0 || 1.0 || align=center|
|-
|align="left"| || align="center"|G/F || align="left"|Kentucky || align="center"|8 ||  align="center"|– || 530 || 13,141 || 1,410 || 1,078 || 6,442 || 24.8 || 2.7 || 2.0 || 12.2 || align=center|
|-
|align="left"| || align="center"|F || align="left"|NC State || align="center"|3 ||  align="center"|– || 165 || 5,816 || 1,562 || 600 || 2,616 || 35.2 || 9.5 || 3.6 || 15.9 || align=center|
|}

H
|-
|align="left"| || align="center"|F || align="left"|George Washington || align="center"|1 ||  align="center"| || 2 || 13 || 2 || 1 || 2 || 6.5 || 1.0 || 0.5 || 1.0 || align=center|
|-
|align="left"| || align="center"|F || align="left"|Texas Tech || align="center"|1 ||  align="center"| || 71 || 635 || 131 || 16 || 145 || 8.9 || 1.8 || 0.2 || 2.0 || align=center|
|-
|align="left"| || align="center"|G/F || align="left"|UConn || align="center"|3 ||  align="center"|– || 212 || 6,095 || 583 || 503 || 3,310 || 28.8 || 2.8 || 2.4 || 15.6 || align=center|
|-
|align="left"| || align="center"|F || align="left"|Georgia Tech || align="center"|3 ||  align="center"|– || 168 || 2,812 || 559 || 130 || 1,128 || 16.7 || 3.3 || 0.8 || 6.7 || align=center|
|-
|align="left"| || align="center"|F/C || align="left"|Grambling State || align="center"|3 ||  align="center"|– || 164 || 2,474 || 930 || 103 || 1,198 || 15.1 || 5.7 || 0.6 || 7.3 || align=center|
|-
|align="left"| || align="center"|F || align="left"|St. Patrick HS (NJ) || align="center"|1 ||  align="center"| || 34 || 511 || 80 || 28 || 225 || 15.0 || 2.4 || 0.8 || 6.6 || align=center|
|-
|align="left"| || align="center"|F || align="left"|Rice || align="center"|1 ||  align="center"| || 5 || 14 || 4 || 0 || 4 || 2.8 || 0.8 || 0.0 || 0.8 || align=center|
|-
|align="left"| || align="center"|G || align="left"|Western Kentucky || align="center"|2 ||  align="center"|– || 125 || 1,439 || 134 || 152 || 633 || 11.5 || 1.1 || 1.2 || 5.1 || align=center|
|-
|align="left"| || align="center"|G || align="left"|Kentucky || align="center"|1 ||  align="center"| || 15 ||  ||  ||  ||  ||  ||  ||  ||  || align=center|
|-
|align="left" bgcolor="#FFFF99"|^ (#11) || align="center"|F/C || align="left"|Houston || align="center"|9 ||  align="center"|– || 731 || 29,218 || 9,305 || 1,294 || bgcolor="#CFECEC"|15,551 || 40.0 || 12.7 || 1.8 || 21.3 || align=center|
|-
|align="left"| || align="center"|F || align="left"|Georgia || align="center"|4 ||  align="center"|– || 226 || 5,746 || 777 || 303 || 2,007 || 25.4 || 3.4 || 1.3 || 8.9 || align=center|
|-
|align="left"| || align="center"|C || align="left"|North Carolina || align="center"|9 ||  align="center"|– || 579 || 14,181 || 3,648 || 348 || 4,460 || 24.5 || 6.3 || 0.6 || 7.7 || align=center|
|-
|align="left" bgcolor="#FFFF99"|^ || align="center"|F/C || align="left"|Detroit Mercy || align="center"|2 ||  align="center"|– || 114 || 2,861 || 605 || 94 || 1,322 || 25.1 || 5.3 || 0.8 || 11.6 || align=center|
|-
|align="left"| || align="center"|G || align="left"|Acadia || align="center"|1 ||  align="center"| || 14 || 70 || 4 || 6 || 28 || 5.0 || 0.3 || 0.4 || 2.0 || align=center|
|-
|align="left"| || align="center"|G || align="left"|Hawaii || align="center"|3 ||  align="center"|– || 186 || 5,619 || 471 || 1,037 || 2,068 || 30.2 || 2.5 || 5.6 || 11.1 || align=center|
|-
|align="left"| || align="center"|F/C || align="left"|NC State || align="center"|1 ||  align="center"| || 15 || 131 || 45 || 7 || 69 || 8.7 || 3.0 || 0.5 || 4.6 || align=center|
|-
|align="left"| || align="center"|F/C || align="left"|Kansas || align="center"|3 ||  align="center"|– || 94 || 1,716 || 545 || 87 || 660 || 18.3 || 5.8 || 0.9 || 7.0 || align=center|
|-
|align="left"| || align="center"|G || align="left"|Oklahoma City || align="center"|1 ||  align="center"| || 3 || 15 || 1 || 1 || 0 || 5.0 || 0.3 || 0.3 || 0.0 || align=center|
|-
|align="left"| || align="center"|G || align="left"|Kansas || align="center"|1 ||  align="center"| || 48 || 1,471 || 129 || 210 || 531 || 30.6 || 2.7 || 4.4 || 11.1 || align=center|
|-
|align="left"| || align="center"|C || align="left"|Cincinnati || align="center"|1 ||  align="center"| || 9 || 58 || 16 || 1 || 7 || 6.4 || 1.8 || 0.1 || 0.8 || align=center|
|-
|align="left"| || align="center"|G || align="left"|UCLA || align="center"|1 ||  align="center"| || 13 || 185 || 13 || 16 || 57 || 14.2 || 1.0 || 1.2 || 4.4 || align=center|
|-
|align="left"| || align="center"|C || align="left"|UCLA || align="center"|1 ||  align="center"| || 5 || 48 || 11 || 0 || 8 || 9.6 || 2.2 || 0.0 || 1.6 || align=center|
|-
|align="left"| || align="center"|C || align="left"|Miami (FL) || align="center"|1 ||  align="center"| || 3 || 28 || 3 || 0 || 0 || 9.3 || 1.0 || 0.0 || 0.0 || align=center|
|-
|align="left"| || align="center"|F || align="left"|Iowa || align="center"|1 ||  align="center"| || 45 || 374 || 108 || 19 || 202 || 8.3 || 2.4 || 0.4 || 4.5 || align=center|
|-
|align="left"| || align="center"|G || align="left"|Texas A&M || align="center"|1 ||  align="center"| || 1 || 1 || 1 || 0 || 0 || 1.0 || 1.0 || 0.0 || 0.0 || align=center|
|-
|align="left"| || align="center"|C || align="left"|Southwest Atlanta Christian Academy (GA) || align="center"|1 ||  align="center"| || 9 || 230 || 83 || 4 || 115 || 25.6 || 9.2 || 0.4 || 12.8 || align=center|
|-
|align="left"| || align="center"|G/F || align="left"|Wake Forest || align="center"|2 ||  align="center"|– || 22 || 500 || 87 || 28 || 210 || 22.7 || 4.0 || 1.3 || 9.5 || align=center|
|-
|align="left" bgcolor="#FFCC00"|+ || align="center"|F || align="left"|Michigan || align="center"|7 ||  align="center"|– || 464 || 17,845 || 3,448 || 1,552 || 8,530 || 38.5 || 7.4 || 3.3 || 18.4 || align=center|
|-
|align="left" bgcolor="#FFFF99"|^ || align="center"|F || align="left"|Mississippi State || align="center"|2 ||  align="center"|– || 158 || 5,303 || 1,642 || 363 || 2,898 || 33.6 || 10.4 || 2.3 || 18.3 || align=center|
|-
|align="left"| || align="center"|G || align="left"|UT Martin || align="center"|1 ||  align="center"| || 11 || 73 || 5 || 17 || 18 || 6.6 || 0.5 || 1.5 || 1.6 || align=center|
|-
|align="left"| || align="center"|G || align="left"|Saint Louis || align="center"|3 ||  align="center"|– || 189 || 6,556 || 1,016 || 638 || 3,350 || 34.7 || 5.4 || 3.4 || 17.7 || align=center|
|-
|align="left"| || align="center"|F/C || align="left"|Minnesota || align="center"|2 ||  align="center"|– || 92 || 1,811 || 531 || 73 || 689 || 19.7 || 5.8 || 0.8 || 7.5 || align=center|
|-
|align="left"| || align="center"|F/C || align="left"|Loyola (IL) || align="center"|1 ||  align="center"| || 24 || 114 || 50 || 11 || 42 || 4.8 || 2.1 || 0.5 || 1.8 || align=center|
|}

I to J
|-
|align="left"| || align="center"|G || align="left"|Missouri || align="center"|2 ||  align="center"| || 37 || 361 || 49 || 26 || 193 || 9.8 || 1.3 || 0.7 || 5.2 || align=center|
|-
|align="left"| || align="center"|G || align="left"|Cleveland State || align="center"|1 ||  align="center"| || 4 || 39 || 3 || 6 || 12 || 9.8 || 0.8 || 1.5 || 3.0 || align=center|
|-
|align="left"| || align="center"|G/F || align="left"|Georgetown || align="center"|1 ||  align="center"| || 75 || 1,133 || 132 || 65 || 374 || 15.1 || 1.8 || 0.9 || 5.0 || align=center|
|-
|align="left"| || align="center"|F || align="left"|Florida State || align="center"|1 ||  align="center"| || 27 || 271 || 54 || 8 || 114 || 10.0 || 2.0 || 0.3 || 4.2 || align=center|
|-
|align="left"| || align="center"|G || align="left"|Duquesne || align="center"|2 ||  align="center"|– || 57 || 1,621 || 129 || 198 || 529 || 28.4 || 2.3 || 3.5 || 9.3 || align=center|
|-
|align="left" bgcolor="#FFCC00"|+ || align="center"|F || align="left"|North Carolina || align="center"|6 ||  align="center"|– || 421 || 16,307 || 3,735 || 773 || 8,736 || 38.7 || 8.9 || 1.8 || 20.8 || align=center|
|-
|align="left"| || align="center"|G || align="left"|Robert Morris (IL) || align="center"|1 ||  align="center"| || 16 || 314 || 65 || 19 || 91 || 19.6 || 4.1 || 1.2 || 5.7 || align=center|
|-
|align="left"| || align="center"|F || align="left"|Indiana || align="center"|4 ||  align="center"|– || 256 || 6,163 || 1,235 || 408 || 1,555 || 24.1 || 4.8 || 1.6 || 6.1 || align=center|
|-
|align="left"| || align="center"|G || align="left"|Vanderbilt || align="center"|1 ||  align="center"| || 4 || 14 || 1 || 1 || 6 || 3.5 || 0.3 || 0.3 || 1.5 || align=center|
|-
|align="left"| || align="center"|G || align="left"|Oak Hill Academy (VA) || align="center"|1 ||  align="center"| || 23 || 374 || 44 || 108 || 81 || 16.3 || 1.9 || 4.7 || 3.5 || align=center|
|-
|align="left"| || align="center"|G/F || align="left"|Portland || align="center"|1 ||  align="center"| || 71 || 2,193 || 351 || 228 || 1,014 || 30.9 || 4.9 || 3.2 || 14.3 || align=center|
|-
|align="left"| || align="center"|F || align="left"|Alabama || align="center"|1 ||  align="center"| || 73 || 1,287 || 195 || 89 || 478 || 17.6 || 2.7 || 1.2 || 6.5 || align=center|
|-
|align="left"| || align="center"|G || align="left"|California || align="center"|2 ||  align="center"|– || 121 || 2,626 || 295 || 259 || 1,075 || 21.7 || 2.4 || 2.1 || 8.9 || align=center|
|-
|align="left"| || align="center"|G || align="left"|Wake Forest || align="center"|7 ||  align="center"|– || 382 || 10,021 || 751 || 1,961 || 3,987 || 26.2 || 2.0 || 5.1 || 10.4 || align=center|
|-
|align="left"| || align="center"|C || align="left"|Stephen F. Austin || align="center"|1 ||  align="center"| || 24 || 337 || 114 || 10 || 93 || 14.0 || 4.8 || 0.4 || 3.9 || align=center|
|-
|align="left"| || align="center"|F/C || align="left"|St. John's || align="center"|1 ||  align="center"| || 2 || 7 || 2 || 0 || 4 || 3.5 || 1.0 || 0.0 || 2.0 || align=center|
|-
|align="left" bgcolor="#FFFF99"|^ (#25) || align="center"|F/C || align="left"|Idaho || align="center"|9 ||  align="center"|– || 560 || 19,723 || 7,243 || 1,510 || 9,781 || 35.2 || 12.9 || 2.7 || 17.5 || align=center|
|-
|align="left"| || align="center"|G/F || align="left"|Syracuse || align="center"|1 ||  align="center"| || 12 || 157 || 18 || 7 || 33 || 13.1 || 1.5 || 0.6 || 2.8 || align=center|
|-
|align="left"| || align="center"|G/F || align="left"|UNLV || align="center"|1 ||  align="center"| || 16 || 114 || 9 || 7 || 37 || 7.1 || 0.6 || 0.4 || 2.3 || align=center|
|-
|align="left"| || align="center"|F/C || align="left"|Albany State || align="center"|9 ||  align="center"|– || 595 || 12,633 || 2,894 || 573 || 1,688 || 21.2 || 4.9 || 1.0 || 2.8 || align=center|
|-
|align="left"| || align="center"|F || align="left"|Louisville || align="center"|1 ||  align="center"| || 43 || 516 || 140 || 18 || 110 || 12.0 || 3.3 || 0.4 || 2.6 || align=center|
|-
|align="left"| || align="center"|G || align="left"|Grambling State || align="center"|3 ||  align="center"|– || 140 || 2,590 || 272 || 283 || 901 || 18.5 || 1.9 || 2.0 || 6.4 || align=center|
|-
|align="left"| || align="center"|F || align="left"|Murray State || align="center"|2 ||  align="center"|– || 124 || 2,558 || 798 || 158 || 716 || 20.6 || 6.4 || 1.3 || 5.8 || align=center|
|-
|align="left"| || align="center"|G || align="left"|Villanova || align="center"|1 ||  align="center"| || 77 || 1,250 || 140 || 200 || 407 || 16.2 || 1.8 || 2.6 || 5.3 || align=center|
|-
|align="left" bgcolor="#FFFF99"|^ || align="center"|G/F || align="left"|North Carolina || align="center"|2 ||  align="center"|– || 142 || 5,124 || 836 || 621 || 3,015 || 36.1 || 5.9 || 4.4 || 21.2 || align=center|
|-
|align="left"| || align="center"|G || align="left"|New Mexico State || align="center"|1 ||  align="center"| || 36 || 243 || 41 || 32 || 41 || 6.8 || 1.1 || 0.9 || 1.1 || align=center|
|}

K to L
|-
|align="left"| || align="center"|F/C || align="left"|Illinois || align="center"|1 ||  align="center"| || 71 || 1,770 || 586 || 225 || 781 || 24.9 || 8.3 || 3.2 || 11.0 || align=center|
|-
|align="left"| || align="center"|G/F || align="left"|Maryland || align="center"|1 ||  align="center"| || 6 || 59 || 11 || 5 || 31 || 9.8 || 1.8 || 0.8 || 5.2 || align=center|
|-
|align="left" bgcolor="#FFFF99"|^ || align="center"|F || align="left"|Tennessee || align="center"|4 ||  align="center"|– || 296 || 9,691 || 1,387 || 1,154 || 6,516 || 32.7 || 4.7 || 3.9 || 22.0 || align=center|
|-
|align="left"| || align="center"|F || align="left"|Nicholls || align="center"|2 ||  align="center"|– || 107 || 1,766 || 379 || 80 || 543 || 16.5 || 3.5 || 0.7 || 5.1 || align=center|
|-
|align="left"| || align="center"|G || align="left"|Kansas || align="center"|1 ||  align="center"| || 37 || 954 || 102 || 142 || 216 || 25.8 || 2.8 || 3.8 || 5.8 || align=center|
|-
|align="left"| || align="center"|G || align="left"|Stanford || align="center"|1 ||  align="center"| || 32 || 598 || 61 || 102 || 136 || 18.7 || 1.9 || 3.2 || 4.3 || align=center|
|-
|align="left"| || align="center"|F || align="left"|Marquette || align="center"|1 ||  align="center"| || 78 || 1,148 || 309 || 57 || 488 || 14.7 || 4.0 || 0.7 || 6.3 || align=center|
|-
|align="left"| || align="center"|F || align="left"|Detroit Mercy || align="center"|2 ||  align="center"|– || 76 || 879 || 228 || 55 || 287 || 11.6 || 3.0 || 0.7 || 3.8 || align=center|
|-
|align="left"| || align="center"|F || align="left"|Toledo || align="center"|3 ||  align="center"|– || 189 || 1,911 || 346 || 99 || 407 || 10.1 || 1.8 || 0.5 || 2.2 || align=center|
|-
|align="left"| || align="center"|G || align="left"|Nebraska-Kearney || align="center"|1 ||  align="center"| || 25 || 72 || 15 || 8 || 19 || 2.9 || 0.6 || 0.3 || 0.8 || align=center|
|-
|align="left"| || align="center"|F/C || align="left"|North Carolina || align="center"|5 ||  align="center"|– || 337 || 7,261 || 2,058 || 299 || 4,089 || 21.5 || 6.1 || 0.9 || 12.1 || align=center|
|-
|align="left"| || align="center"|F/C || align="left"|Duke || align="center"|4 ||  align="center"|– || 206 || 5,373 || 1,188 || 532 || 1,650 || 26.1 || 5.8 || 2.6 || 8.0 || align=center|
|-
|align="left"| || align="center"|C || align="left"|Central Park Christian HS (AL) || align="center"|1 ||  align="center"| || 11 || 55 || 11 || 2 || 11 || 5.0 || 1.0 || 0.2 || 1.0 || align=center|
|-
|align="left"| || align="center"|G || align="left"|North Carolina || align="center"|1 ||  align="center"| || 8 || 57 || 6 || 9 || 25 || 7.1 || 0.8 || 1.1 || 3.1 || align=center|
|-
|align="left"| || align="center"|F/C || align="left"|Niagara || align="center"|1 ||  align="center"| || 53 || 845 || 244 || 25 || 216 || 15.9 || 4.6 || 0.5 || 4.1 || align=center|
|-
|align="left"| || align="center"|G || align="left"|La Salle || align="center"|4 ||  align="center"|– || 130 || 2,410 || 205 || 167 || 898 || 18.5 || 1.6 || 1.3 || 6.9 || align=center|
|-
|align="left" bgcolor="#FFFF99"|^ || align="center"|G || align="left"|Indiana || align="center"|2 ||  align="center"|– || 102 || 3,343 || 267 || 521 || 1,352 || 32.8 || 2.6 || 5.1 || 13.3 || align=center|
|-
|align="left"| || align="center"|F/C || align="left"|Maryland || align="center"|1 ||  align="center"| || 3 || 4 || 2 || 0 || 4 || 1.3 || 0.7 || 0.0 || 1.3 || align=center|
|-
|align="left"| || align="center"|F || align="left"|Alief Elsik HS (TX) || align="center"|2 ||  align="center"|– || 60 || 1,743 || 293 || 90 || 581 || 29.1 || 4.9 || 1.5 || 9.7 || align=center|
|-
|align="left"| || align="center"|F || align="left"|South Dakota State || align="center"|1 ||  align="center"| || 7 || 53 || 12 || 4 || 8 || 7.6 || 1.7 || 0.6 || 1.1 || align=center|
|-
|align="left"| || align="center"|G || align="left"|Peoria HS (IL) || align="center"|2 ||  align="center"| || 43 || 986 || 95 || 154 || 303 || 22.9 || 2.2 || 3.6 || 7.0 || align=center|
|-
|align="left"| || align="center"|G || align="left"|St. John's || align="center"|1 ||  align="center"| || 47 || 1,108 || 160 || 73 || 380 || 23.6 || 3.4 || 1.6 || 8.1 || align=center|
|-
|align="left"| || align="center"|G || align="left"|St. John's || align="center"|9 ||  align="center"|– || 591 || 18,677 || 1,854 || 2,363 || 9,833 || 31.6 || 3.1 || 4.0 || 16.6 || align=center|
|-
|align="left"| || align="center"|F || align="left"|Oregon || align="center"|2 ||  align="center"|– || 146 || 2,322 || 638 || 98 || 1,046 || 15.9 || 4.4 || 0.7 || 7.2 || align=center|
|-
|align="left"| || align="center"|G || align="left"|Maryland || align="center"|2 ||  align="center"|– || 114 || 2,326 || 195 || 653 || 811 || 20.4 || 1.7 || 5.7 || 7.1 || align=center|
|-
|align="left"| || align="center"|G || align="left"|Nebraska || align="center"|2 ||  align="center"|– || 146 || 3,444 || 271 || 509 || 1,202 || 23.6 || 1.9 || 3.5 || 8.2 || align=center|
|}

M
|-
|align="left"| || align="center"|G || align="left"|Miami (FL) || align="center"|1 ||  align="center"| || 30 || 287 || 34 || 15 || 90 || 9.6 || 1.1 || 0.5 || 3.0 || align=center|
|-
|align="left"| || align="center"|G || align="left"|Butler || align="center"|2 ||  align="center"|– || 71 || 920 || 108 || 154 || 267 || 13.0 || 1.5 || 2.2 || 3.8 || align=center|
|-
|align="left"| || align="center"|F || align="left"|UCLA || align="center"|3 ||  align="center"|– || 176 || 4,213 || 754 || 250 || 2,202 || 23.9 || 4.3 || 1.4 || 12.5 || align=center|
|-
|align="left" bgcolor="#CCFFCC"|x || align="center"|C || align="left"|France || align="center"|3 ||  align="center"|– || 142 || 2,198 || 590 || 97 || 678 || 15.5 || 4.2 || 0.7 || 4.8 || align=center|
|-
|align="left"| || align="center"|F/C || align="left"|Hampton || align="center"|5 ||  align="center"|– || 373 || 11,156 || 3,044 || 542 || 3,345 || 29.9 || 8.2 || 1.5 || 9.0 || align=center|
|-
|align="left" bgcolor="#FFCC00"|+ || align="center"|G || align="left"|Mississippi State || align="center"|7 ||  align="center"|– || 548 || 17,984 || 1,458 || 1,523 || 11,083 || 32.8 || 2.7 || 2.8 || 20.2 || align=center|
|-
|align="left" bgcolor="#FFFF99"|^ || align="center"|F/C || align="left"|Petersburg HS (VA) || align="center"|2 ||  align="center"|– || 152 || 5,180 || 1,708 || 232 || 3,367 || 34.1 || 11.2 || 1.5 || 22.2 || align=center|
|-
|align="left"| || align="center"|F || align="left"|San Diego State || align="center"|1 ||  align="center"| || 1 || 6 || 0 || 0 || 1 || 6.0 || 0.0 || 0.0 || 1.0 || align=center|
|-
|align="left"| || align="center"|F || align="left"|Jackson State || align="center"|3 ||  align="center"|– || 163 || 1,839 || 656 || 55 || 646 || 11.3 || 4.0 || 0.3 || 4.0 || align=center|
|-
|align="left"| || align="center"|G || align="left"|Northwestern || align="center"|1 ||  align="center"| || 33 || 626 || 79 || 76 || 196 || 19.0 || 2.4 || 2.3 || 5.9 || align=center|
|-
|align="left" bgcolor="#FFCC00"|+ || align="center"|G/F || align="left"|Duke || align="center"|6 ||  align="center"|– || 480 || 14,864 || 2,972 || 1,019 || 8,017 || 31.0 || 6.2 || 2.1 || 16.7 || align=center|
|-
|align="left"| || align="center"|F || align="left"|Kansas State || align="center"|4 ||  align="center"|– || 118 || 1,741 || 253 || 55 || 688 || 14.8 || 2.1 || 0.5 || 5.8 || align=center|
|-
|align="left"| || align="center"|G || align="left"|Virginia || align="center"|3 ||  align="center"|– || 194 || 2,897 || 244 || 216 || 1,175 || 14.9 || 1.3 || 1.1 || 6.1 || align=center|
|-
|align="left"| || align="center"|G || align="left"|Wisconsin || align="center"|1 ||  align="center"| || 45 || 1,161 || 67 || 199 || 552 || 25.8 || 1.5 || 4.4 || 12.3 || align=center|
|-
|align="left"| || align="center"|G || align="left"|VCU || align="center"|1 ||  align="center"| || 23 || 215 || 24 || 40 || 52 || 9.3 || 1.0 || 1.7 || 2.3 || align=center|
|-
|align="left"| || align="center"|F || align="left"|Morehead State || align="center"|1 ||  align="center"| || 62 || 653 || 143 || 24 || 188 || 10.5 || 2.3 || 0.4 || 3.0 || align=center|
|-
|align="left"| || align="center"|G || align="left"|UCLA || align="center"|1 ||  align="center"| || 43 || 448 || 39 || 73 || 122 || 10.4 || 0.9 || 1.7 || 2.8 || align=center|
|-
|align="left"| || align="center"|G || align="left"|UAB || align="center"|1 ||  align="center"| || 2 || 9 || 2 || 1 || 4 || 4.5 || 1.0 || 0.5 || 2.0 || align=center|
|-
|align="left"| || align="center"|F || align="left"|Syracuse || align="center"|2 ||  align="center"|– || 21 || 98 || 27 || 4 || 47 || 4.7 || 1.3 || 0.2 || 2.2 || align=center|
|-
|align="left"| || align="center"|C || align="left"|Nevada || align="center"|4 ||  align="center"|– || 255 || 5,428 || 1,533 || 100 || 2,159 || 21.3 || 6.0 || 0.4 || 8.5 || align=center|
|-
|align="left"| || align="center"|F/C || align="left"|Utah || align="center"|2 ||  align="center"|– || 66 || 637 || 177 || 38 || 473 || 9.7 || 2.7 || 0.6 || 7.2 || align=center|
|-
|align="left"| || align="center"|F || align="left"|Fresno State || align="center"|3 ||  align="center"|– || 190 || 3,007 || 628 || 246 || 479 || 15.8 || 3.3 || 1.3 || 2.5 || align=center|
|-
|align="left"| || align="center"|C || align="left"|Marquette || align="center"|2 ||  align="center"|– || 135 || 1,729 || 335 || 21 || 278 || 12.8 || 2.5 || 0.2 || 2.1 || align=center|
|-
|align="left"| || align="center"|G || align="left"|North Carolina || align="center"|1 ||  align="center"| || 35 || 427 || 21 || 73 || 130 || 12.2 || 0.6 || 2.1 || 3.7 || align=center|
|-
|align="left"| || align="center"|G/F || align="left"|Creighton || align="center"|1 ||  align="center"| || 30 || 430 || 36 || 23 || 174 || 14.3 || 1.2 || 0.8 || 5.8 || align=center|
|-
|align="left"| || align="center"|G/F || align="left"|NYU || align="center"|1 ||  align="center"| || 50 || 653 || 121 || 24 || 204 || 13.1 || 2.4 || 0.5 || 4.1 || align=center|
|-
|align="left"| || align="center"|F/C || align="left"|Maryland || align="center"|3 ||  align="center"|– || 187 || 3,704 || 522 || 160 || 1,514 || 19.8 || 2.8 || 0.9 || 8.1 || align=center|
|-
|align="left" bgcolor="#CCFFCC"|x || align="center"|G || align="left"|Tennessee || align="center"|1 ||  align="center"| || 27 || 333 || 40 || 30 || 160 || 12.3 || 1.5 || 1.1 || 5.9 || align=center|
|-
|align="left"| || align="center"|G || align="left"|Miles || align="center"|1 ||  align="center"| || 5 || 28 || 6 || 1 || 3 || 5.6 || 1.2 || 0.2 || 0.6 || align=center|
|-
|align="left"| || align="center"|G || align="left"|Kentucky || align="center"|1 ||  align="center"| || 77 || 1,119 || 126 || 70 || 487 || 14.5 || 1.6 || 0.9 || 6.3 || align=center|
|-
|align="left"| || align="center"|G/F || align="left"|Seattle || align="center"|2 ||  align="center"|– || 66 || 1,593 || 171 || 114 || 639 || 24.1 || 2.6 || 1.7 || 9.7 || align=center|
|-
|align="left"| || align="center"|G || align="left"|Utah || align="center"|2 ||  align="center"|– || 79 || 1,043 || 134 || 240 || 290 || 13.2 || 1.7 || 3.0 || 3.7 || align=center|
|-
|align="left"| || align="center"|G/F || align="left"|Florida || align="center"|1 ||  align="center"| || 54 || 1,805 || 336 || 212 || 586 || 33.4 || 6.2 || 3.9 || 10.9 || align=center|
|-
|align="left" bgcolor="#FFFF99"|^ (#10) || align="center"|G || align="left"|Winston-Salem State || align="center"|5 ||  align="center"|– || 328 || 12,084 || 1,223 || 1,507 || 7,775 || 36.8 || 3.7 || 4.6 || 23.7 || align=center|
|-
|align="left"| || align="center"|F || align="left"|Kansas || align="center"|4 ||  align="center"|– || 210 || 5,937 || 1,234 || 365 || 2,630 || 28.3 || 5.9 || 1.7 || 12.5 || align=center|
|-
|align="left"| || align="center"|G || align="left"|Northeastern || align="center"|1 ||  align="center"| || 12 || 160 || 25 || 19 || 55 || 13.3 || 2.1 || 1.6 || 4.6 || align=center|
|-
|align="left"| || align="center"|G || align="left"|Syracuse || align="center"|1 ||  align="center"| || 8 || 27 || 1 || 3 || 9 || 3.4 || 0.1 || 0.4 || 1.1 || align=center|
|-
|align="left"| || align="center"|C || align="left"|Romania || align="center"|4 ||  align="center"|– || 276 || 6,461 || 1,889 || 141 || 2,915 || 23.4 || 6.8 || 0.5 || 10.6 || align=center|
|-
|align="left"| || align="center"|F || align="left"|Boston College || align="center"|2 ||  align="center"|– || 30 || 187 || 55 || 6 || 91 || 6.2 || 1.8 || 0.2 || 3.0 || align=center|
|-
|align="left"| || align="center"|F || align="left"|UCLA || align="center"|4 ||  align="center"|– || 280 || 6,525 || 882 || 261 || 3,101 || 23.3 || 3.2 || 0.9 || 11.1 || align=center|
|-
|align="left"| || align="center"|F/C || align="left"|Detroit Mercy || align="center"|2 ||  align="center"|– || 120 || 1,117 || 340 || 48 || 330 || 9.3 || 2.8 || 0.4 || 2.8 || align=center|
|-
|align="left"| || align="center"|G/F || align="left"|Wichita State || align="center"|1 ||  align="center"| || 4 || 17 || 1 || 1 || 6 || 4.3 || 0.3 || 0.3 || 1.5 || align=center|
|}

N to O
|-
|align="left"| || align="center"|C || align="left"|Rutgers || align="center"|2 ||  align="center"|– || 19 || 83 || 7 || 0 || 14 || 4.4 || 0.4 || 0.0 || 0.7 || align=center|
|-
|align="left"| || align="center"|G || align="left"|Towson || align="center"|1 ||  align="center"| || 40 || 807 || 83 || 47 || 390 || 20.2 || 2.1 || 1.2 || 9.8 || align=center|
|-
|align="left" bgcolor="#FFFF99"|^ || align="center"|F || align="left"|Iowa || align="center"|1 ||  align="center"| || 62 || 1,071 || 279 || 72 || 419 || 17.3 || 4.5 || 1.2 || 6.8 || align=center|
|-
|align="left"| || align="center"|G || align="left"|Washington || align="center"|1 ||  align="center"| || 49 || 556 || 70 || 52 || 239 || 11.3 || 1.4 || 1.1 || 4.9 || align=center|
|-
|align="left"|Nenê || align="center"|F/C || align="left"|Brazil || align="center"|5 ||  align="center"|– || 249 || 6,290 || 1,388 || 569 || 2,941 || 25.3 || 5.6 || 2.3 || 11.8 || align=center|
|-
|align="left"| || align="center"|F || align="left"|UNLV || align="center"|2 ||  align="center"|– || 118 || 2,721 || 449 || 156 || 847 || 23.1 || 3.8 || 1.3 || 7.2 || align=center|
|-
|align="left"| || align="center"|F || align="left"|St. Bonaventure || align="center"|1 ||  align="center"| || 28 || 231 || 34 || 7 || 70 || 8.3 || 1.2 || 0.3 || 2.5 || align=center|
|-
|align="left"| || align="center"|G || align="left"|Northwestern Oklahoma State || align="center"|1 ||  align="center"| || 1 || 6 || 1 || 0 || 2 || 6.0 || 1.0 || 0.0 || 2.0 || align=center|
|-
|align="left"| || align="center"|G || align="left"|Ohio State || align="center"|1 ||  align="center"| || 39 || 589 || 67 || 84 || 232 || 15.1 || 1.7 || 2.2 || 5.9 || align=center|
|-
|align="left"| || align="center"|F/C || align="left"|Virginia Union || align="center"|1 ||  align="center"| || 42 || 514 || 107 || 40 || 74 || 12.2 || 2.5 || 1.0 || 1.8 || align=center|
|-
|align="left"| || align="center"|F/C || align="left"|Argentina || align="center"|1 ||  align="center"| || 57 || 650 || 105 || 51 || 83 || 11.4 || 1.8 || 0.9 || 1.5 || align=center|
|-
|align="left"| || align="center"|C || align="left"|Villanova || align="center"|1 ||  align="center"| || 19 || 75 || 22 || 3 || 24 || 3.9 || 1.2 || 0.2 || 1.3 || align=center|
|-
|align="left"| || align="center"|C || align="left"|UAB || align="center"|1 ||  align="center"| || 3 || 3 || 4 || 0 || 5 || 1.0 || 1.3 || 0.0 || 1.7 || align=center|
|-
|align="left" bgcolor="#FFCC00"|+ || align="center"|G || align="left"|Illinois || align="center"|4 ||  align="center"|– || 247 || 8,586 || 918 || 792 || 4,680 || 34.8 || 3.7 || 3.2 || 18.9 || align=center|
|-
|align="left"| || align="center"|F/C || align="left"|UConn || align="center"|1 ||  align="center"| || 79 || 2,052 || 692 || 93 || 765 || 26.0 || 8.8 || 1.2 || 9.7 || align=center|
|-
|align="left"| || align="center"|G/F || align="left"|North Carolina || align="center"|1 ||  align="center"| || 15 || 123 || 14 || 13 || 32 || 8.2 || 0.9 || 0.9 || 2.1 || align=center|
|-
|align="left"| || align="center"|G || align="left"|Georgia Tech || align="center"|1 ||  align="center"| || 6 || 42 || 4 || 4 || 14 || 7.0 || 0.7 || 0.7 || 2.3 || align=center|
|-
|align="left"| || align="center"|G/F || align="left"|Purdue || align="center"|1 ||  align="center"| || 1 || 10 || 2 || 1 || 5 || 10.0 || 2.0 || 1.0 || 5.0 || align=center|
|-
|align="left"| || align="center"|G || align="left"|Saint Louis || align="center"|1 ||  align="center"| || 64 || 916 || 158 || 49 || 181 || 14.3 || 2.5 || 0.8 || 2.8 || align=center|
|-
|align="left"| || align="center"|F || align="left"|Kansas || align="center"|4 ||  align="center"|– || 252 || 5,262 || 886 || 178 || 2,063 || 20.9 || 3.5 || 0.7 || 8.2 || align=center|
|-
|align="left"| || align="center"|G || align="left"|La Salle || align="center"|3 ||  align="center"|– || 188 || 3,443 || 318 || 495 || 1,160 || 18.3 || 1.7 || 2.6 || 6.2 || align=center|
|-
|align="left"| || align="center"|F || align="left"|Oral Roberts || align="center"|1 ||  align="center"| || 5 || 112 || 11 || 7 || 31 || 22.4 || 2.2 || 1.4 || 6.2 || align=center|
|}

P
|-
|align="left"| || align="center"|C || align="left"|Coppin State || align="center"|2 ||  align="center"|– || 79 || 557 || 168 || 27 || 255 || 7.1 || 2.1 || 0.3 || 3.2 || align=center|
|-
|align="left"| || align="center"|G || align="left"|USC || align="center"|1 ||  align="center"| || 31 || 1,084 || 132 || 242 || 560 || 35.0 || 4.3 || 7.8 || 18.1 || align=center|
|-
|align="left"| || align="center"|G/F || align="left"|UNLV || align="center"|1 ||  align="center"| || 8 || 74 || 11 || 7 || 30 || 9.3 || 1.4 || 0.9 || 3.8 || align=center|
|-
|align="left"| || align="center"|G || align="left"|Arkansas || align="center"|1 ||  align="center"| || 7 || 102 || 6 || 14 || 21 || 14.6 || 0.9 || 2.0 || 3.0 || align=center|
|-
|align="left"| || align="center"|F || align="left"|Duke || align="center"|1 ||  align="center"| || 25 || 682 || 180 || 68 || 374 || 27.3 || 7.2 || 2.7 || 15.0 || align=center|
|-
|align="left"| || align="center"|F/C || align="left"|Duke || align="center"|1 ||  align="center"| || 13 || 178 || 40 || 7 || 48 || 13.7 || 3.1 || 0.5 || 3.7 || align=center|
|-
|align="left"| || align="center"|F || align="left"|Ouachita Baptist || align="center"|2 ||  align="center"|– || 25 || 100 || 24 || 5 || 56 || 4.0 || 1.0 || 0.2 || 2.2 || align=center|
|-
|align="left"| || align="center"|G || align="left"|Oregon State || align="center"|1 ||  align="center"| || 3 || 16 || 2 || 4 || 11 || 5.3 || 0.7 || 1.3 || 3.7 || align=center|
|-
|align="left"| || align="center"|C || align="left"|Ukraine || align="center"|2 ||  align="center"|– || 67 || 597 || 142 || 9 || 241 || 8.9 || 2.1 || 0.1 || 3.6 || align=center|
|-
|align="left"| || align="center"|G || align="left"|Missouri || align="center"|1 ||  align="center"| || 40 || 529 || 65 || 57 || 153 || 13.2 || 1.6 || 1.4 || 3.8 || align=center|
|-
|align="left"| || align="center"|C || align="left"|Michigan State || align="center"|1 ||  align="center"| || 2 || 5 || 0 || 0 || 0 || 2.5 || 0.0 || 0.0 || 0.0 || align=center|
|-
|align="left"| || align="center"|G/F || align="left"|Wheaton (IL) || align="center"|1 ||  align="center"| || 2 || 3 || 1 || 0 || 2 || 1.5 || 0.5 || 0.0 || 1.0 || align=center|
|-
|align="left"| || align="center"|G/F || align="left"|Bradley || align="center"|2 ||  align="center"|– || 79 || 1,124 || 137 || 85 || 634 || 14.2 || 1.7 || 1.1 || 8.0 || align=center|
|-
|align="left"| || align="center"|G/F || align="left"|Kansas || align="center"|1 ||  align="center"| || 73 || 1,914 || 294 || 144 || 868 || 26.2 || 4.0 || 2.0 || 11.9 || align=center|
|-
|align="left"| || align="center"|F/C || align="left"|Xavier || align="center"|1 ||  align="center"| || 45 || 614 || 155 || 31 || 205 || 13.6 || 3.4 || 0.7 || 4.6 || align=center|
|-
|align="left"| || align="center"|G || align="left"|Saint Francis (PA) || align="center"|6 ||  align="center"|–– || 395 || 10,426 || 614 || 2,593 || 4,194 || 26.4 || 1.6 || 6.6 || 10.6 || align=center|
|-
|align="left"| || align="center"|F || align="left"|Georgetown || align="center"|6 ||  align="center"|– || 384 || 10,255 || 1,906 || 553 || 4,121 || 26.7 || 5.0 || 1.4 || 10.7 || align=center|
|-
|align="left"| || align="center"|F || align="left"|Arkansas || align="center"|1 ||  align="center"| || 28 || 768 || 242 || 43 || 400 || 27.4 || 8.6 || 1.5 || 14.3 || align=center|
|-
|align="left"| || align="center"|G || align="left"|Boston College || align="center"|1 ||  align="center"| || 10 || 107 || 14 || 22 || 21 || 10.7 || 1.4 || 2.2 || 2.1 || align=center|
|-
|align="left"| || align="center"|G || align="left"|UConn || align="center"|1 ||  align="center"| || 57 || 1,278 || 114 || 205 || 441 || 22.4 || 2.0 || 3.6 || 7.7 || align=center|
|-
|align="left"| || align="center"|G || align="left"|Oklahoma || align="center"|3 ||  align="center"|– || 214 || 3,936 || 421 || 783 || 1,472 || 18.4 || 2.0 || 3.7 || 6.9 || align=center|
|-
|align="left"| || align="center"|G || align="left"|Georgia Tech || align="center"|1 ||  align="center"| || 7 || 127 || 7 || 18 || 56 || 18.1 || 1.0 || 2.6 || 8.0 || align=center|
|-
|align="left"| || align="center"|G || align="left"|Kansas || align="center"|1 ||  align="center"| || 2 || 22 || 2 || 7 || 7 || 11.0 || 1.0 || 3.5 || 3.5 || align=center|
|-
|align="left"| || align="center"|G/F || align="left"|Maryland || align="center"|3 ||  align="center"|– || 110 || 1,258 || 166 || 151 || 337 || 11.4 || 1.5 || 1.4 || 3.1 || align=center|
|}

Q to R
|-
|align="left"| || align="center"|G/F || align="left"|Xavier || align="center"|2 ||  align="center"|– || 43 || 221 || 37 || 15 || 127 || 5.1 || 0.9 || 0.3 || 3.0 || align=center|
|-
|align="left"| || align="center"|C || align="left"|Puerto Rico || align="center"|1 ||  align="center"| || 6 || 20 || 4 || 0 || 11 || 3.3 || 0.7 || 0.0 || 1.8 || align=center|
|-
|align="left"| || align="center"|G || align="left"|Stanford || align="center"|1 ||  align="center"| || 49 || 743 || 56 || 97 || 271 || 15.2 || 1.1 || 2.0 || 5.5 || align=center|
|-
|align="left"| || align="center"|F || align="left"|Georgetown || align="center"|1 ||  align="center"| || 17 || 333 || 77 || 10 || 109 || 19.6 || 4.5 || 0.6 || 6.4 || align=center|
|-
|align="left"| || align="center"|G || align="left"|Georgia Tech || align="center"|2 ||  align="center"|– || 16 || 152 || 24 || 9 || 43 || 9.5 || 1.5 || 0.6 || 2.7 || align=center|
|-
|align="left" bgcolor="#FFFF99"|^ || align="center"|G || align="left"|Kansas State || align="center"|3 ||  align="center"|– || 161 || 5,525 || 494 || 418 || 2,866 || 34.3 || 3.1 || 2.6 || 17.8 || align=center|
|-
|align="left"| || align="center"|G || align="left"|Saint Peter's || align="center"|3 ||  align="center"|– || 79 || 853 || 93 || 73 || 393 || 10.8 || 1.2 || 0.9 || 5.0 || align=center|
|-
|align="left"| || align="center"|G/F || align="left"|Providence || align="center"|6 ||  align="center"|– || 418 || 12,463 || 1,409 || 1,154 || 5,185 || 29.8 || 3.4 || 2.8 || 12.4 || align=center|
|-
|align="left"| || align="center"|G || align="left"|Duke || align="center"|1 ||  align="center"| || 29 || 683 || 71 || 58 || 210 || 23.6 || 2.4 || 2.0 || 7.2 || align=center|
|-
|align="left"| || align="center"|G/F || align="left"|Oral Roberts || align="center"|1 ||  align="center"| || 26 || 350 || 68 || 20 || 127 || 13.5 || 2.6 || 0.8 || 4.9 || align=center|
|-
|align="left"| || align="center"|F || align="left"|USC || align="center"|2 ||  align="center"|– || 138 || 4,433 || 1,226 || 335 || 2,463 || 32.1 || 8.9 || 2.4 || 17.8 || align=center|
|-
|align="left"| || align="center"|F || align="left"|Florida || align="center"|2 ||  align="center"|– || 8 || 108 || 25 || 6 || 49 || 13.5 || 3.1 || 0.8 || 6.1 || align=center|
|-
|align="left"| || align="center"|G || align="left"|Wyoming || align="center"|1 ||  align="center"| || 38 || 583 || 55 || 77 || 264 || 15.3 || 1.4 || 2.0 || 6.9 || align=center|
|-
|align="left"| || align="center"|G/F || align="left"|Centenary || align="center"|2 ||  align="center"| || 16 || 288 || 31 || 27 || 98 || 18.0 || 1.9 || 1.7 || 6.1 || align=center|
|-
|align="left"| || align="center"|F/C || align="left"|Tennessee State || align="center"|3 ||  align="center"|– || 199 || 4,378 || 1,224 || 198 || 2,017 || 22.0 || 6.2 || 1.0 || 10.1 || align=center|
|-
|align="left"| || align="center"|G || align="left"|SMU || align="center"|1 ||  align="center"| || 25 || 261 || 22 || 5 || 38 || 10.4 || 0.9 || 0.2 || 1.5 || align=center|
|-
|align="left"| || align="center"|C || align="left"|Tennessee || align="center"|1 ||  align="center"| || 42 || 412 || 120 || 20 || 81 || 9.8 || 2.9 || 0.5 || 1.9 || align=center|
|-
|align="left"| || align="center"|F/C || align="left"|Central Michigan || align="center"|2 ||  align="center"|– || 115 || 2,990 || 812 || 206 || 1,155 || 26.0 || 7.1 || 1.8 || 10.0 || align=center|
|-
|align="left"| || align="center"|F || align="left"|Tulsa || align="center"|3 ||  align="center"|– || 185 || 2,543 || 665 || 97 || 233 || 13.7 || 3.6 || 0.5 || 1.3 || align=center|
|-
|align="left" bgcolor="#FFCC00"|+ || align="center"|F/C || align="left"|Iona || align="center"|5 ||  align="center"|– || 303 || 10,708 || 3,285 || 985 || 5,653 || 35.3 || 10.8 || 3.3 || 18.7 || align=center|
|-
|align="left"| || align="center"|F || align="left"|Long Beach State || align="center"|1 ||  align="center"| || 70 || 1,388 || 208 || 72 || 315 || 19.8 || 3.0 || 1.0 || 4.5 || align=center|
|}

S
|-
|align="left" bgcolor="#FFFF99"|^ || align="center"|F/C || align="left"|Virginia || align="center"|1 ||  align="center"| || 10 || 108 || 30 || 4 || 22 || 10.8 || 3.0 || 0.4 || 2.2 || align=center|
|-
|align="left"| || align="center"|G || align="left"|Czech Republic || align="center"|3 ||  align="center"|– || 210 || 4,526 || 595 || 777 || 1,387 || 21.6 || 2.8 || 3.7 || 6.6 || align=center|
|-
|align="left"| || align="center"|F/C || align="left"|Texas Southern || align="center"|2 ||  align="center"|– || 103 || 1,664 || 367 || 66 || 697 || 30.8 || 6.8 || 1.2 || 6.8 || align=center|
|-
|align="left"| || align="center"|F || align="left"|LSU || align="center"|1 ||  align="center"| || 2 || 13 || 3 || 0 || 6 || 6.5 || 1.5 || 0.0 || 3.0 || align=center|
|-
|align="left"| || align="center"|F || align="left"|Virginia || align="center"|1 ||  align="center"| || 76 || 1,406 || 247 || 80 || 668 || 18.5 || 3.3 || 1.1 || 8.8 || align=center|
|-
|align="left"| || align="center"|F/C || align="left"|Portland || align="center"|4 ||  align="center"|– || 263 || 7,454 || 2,646 || 490 || 3,460 || 28.3 || 10.1 || 1.9 || 13.2 || align=center|
|-
|align="left"| || align="center"|F || align="left"|France || align="center"|5 ||  align="center"|– || 326 || 5,345 || 1,194 || 176 || 2,097 || 16.4 || 3.7 || 0.5 || 6.4 || align=center|
|-
|align="left"| || align="center"|G || align="left"|Nevada || align="center"|3 ||  align="center"|– || 125 || 2,438 || 298 || 375 || 1,104 || 19.5 || 2.4 || 3.0 || 8.8 || align=center|
|-
|align="left"| || align="center"|G || align="left"|Lamar || align="center"|1 ||  align="center"| || 21 || 87 || 4 || 6 || 20 || 4.1 || 0.2 || 0.3 || 1.0 || align=center|
|-
|align="left"| || align="center"|G || align="left"|Arizona || align="center"|1 ||  align="center"| || 22 || 159 || 22 || 25 || 51 || 7.2 || 1.0 || 1.1 || 2.3 || align=center|
|-
|align="left"| || align="center"|G || align="left"|Providence || align="center"|1 ||  align="center"| || 20 || 146 || 7 || 36 || 61 || 7.3 || 0.4 || 1.8 || 3.1 || align=center|
|-
|align="left"| || align="center"|G || align="left"|Maryland || align="center"|1 ||  align="center"| || 47 || 963 || 94 || 150 || 198 || 20.5 || 2.0 || 3.2 || 4.2 || align=center|
|-
|align="left"| || align="center"|G/F || align="left"|DePaul || align="center"|2 ||  align="center"|– || 66 || 721 || 129 || 37 || 232 || 10.9 || 2.0 || 0.6 || 3.5 || align=center|
|-
|align="left"| || align="center"|F || align="left"|Florida State || align="center"|3 ||  align="center"|– || 148 || 2,605 || 472 || 92 || 612 || 17.6 || 3.2 || 0.6 || 4.1 || align=center|
|-
|align="left"| || align="center"|F || align="left"|Murray State || align="center"|2 ||  align="center"| || 44 || 1,028 || 302 || 37 || 293 || 23.4 || 6.9 || 0.8 || 6.7 || align=center|
|-
|align="left"| || align="center"|G || align="left"|Michigan State || align="center"|1 ||  align="center"| || 62 || 2,077 || 159 || 452 || 805 || 33.5 || 2.6 || 7.3 || 13.0 || align=center|
|-
|align="left"| || align="center"|F || align="left"|Kenyon || align="center"|1 ||  align="center"| || 3 || 20 || 7 || 0 || 4 || 6.7 || 2.3 || 0.0 || 1.3 || align=center|
|-
|align="left" bgcolor="#FFFF99"|^ || align="center"|G/F || align="left"|Evansville || align="center"|1 ||  align="center"| || 59 || 952 || 230 || 110 || 338 || 16.1 || 3.9 || 1.9 || 5.7 || align=center|
|-
|align="left"| || align="center"|F || align="left"|Cleveland State || align="center"|1 ||  align="center"| || 5 || 45 || 4 || 4 || 7 || 9.0 || 0.8 || 0.8 || 1.4 || align=center|
|-
|align="left"| || align="center"|F/C || align="left"|Colorado State || align="center"|3 ||  align="center"|– || 119 || 1,483 || 348 || 63 || 577 || 12.5 || 2.9 || 0.5 || 4.8 || align=center|
|-
|align="left"| || align="center"|G || align="left"|Louisville || align="center"|3 ||  align="center"|– || 124 || 2,302 || 195 || 290 || 917 || 18.6 || 1.6 || 2.3 || 7.4 || align=center|
|-
|align="left"| || align="center"|F || align="left"|Providence || align="center"|2 ||  align="center"|– || 125 || 2,755 || 893 || 157 || 590 || 22.0 || 7.1 || 1.3 || 4.7 || align=center|
|-
|align="left"| || align="center"|F || align="left"|Louisiana-Monroe || align="center"|1 ||  align="center"| || 17 || 180 || 22 || 10 || 51 || 10.6 || 1.3 || 0.6 || 3.0 || align=center|
|-
|align="left"| || align="center"|G || align="left"|UNLV || align="center"|2 ||  align="center"|– || 122 || 4,062 || 281 || 595 || 1,911 || 33.3 || 2.3 || 4.9 || 15.7 || align=center|
|-
|align="left"| || align="center"|G || align="left"|Duquesne || align="center"|1 ||  align="center"| || 8 || 98 || 15 || 9 || 45 || 12.3 || 1.9 || 1.1 || 5.6 || align=center|
|-
|align="left"| || align="center"|F || align="left"|Wake Forest || align="center"|3 ||  align="center"|– || 194 || 3,775 || 632 || 267 || 1,343 || 19.5 || 3.3 || 1.4 || 6.9 || align=center|
|-
|align="left"| || align="center"|G/F || align="left"|North Carolina || align="center"|2 ||  align="center"|– || 96 || 3,521 || 352 || 419 || 1,870 || 36.7 || 3.7 || 4.4 || 19.5 || align=center|
|-
|align="left"| || align="center"|F/C || align="left"|Wichita State || align="center"|3 ||  align="center"|– || 182 || 3,490 || 759 || 270 || 1,364 || 19.2 || 4.2 || 1.5 || 7.5 || align=center|
|-
|align="left"| || align="center"|F || align="left"|Thomas More || align="center"|2 ||  align="center"|– || 39 || 701 || 171 || 45 || 253 || 18.0 || 4.4 || 1.2 || 6.5 || align=center|
|-
|align="left"| || align="center"|G || align="left"|Washington Union HS (CA) || align="center"|4 ||  align="center"|– || 236 || 6,485 || 592 || 612 || 2,135 || 27.5 || 2.5 || 2.6 || 9.0 || align=center|
|-
|align="left"| || align="center"|F || align="left"|Michigan || align="center"|1 ||  align="center"| || 2 || 6 || 3 || 1 || 4 || 3.0 || 1.5 || 0.5 || 2.0 || align=center|
|-
|align="left"| || align="center"|F || align="left"|Coppin State || align="center"|4 ||  align="center"|– || 200 || 4,433 || 906 || 286 || 1,705 || 22.2 || 4.5 || 1.4 || 8.5 || align=center|
|-
|align="left"| || align="center"|G/F || align="left"|Arizona State || align="center"|1 ||  align="center"| || 25 || 116 || 22 || 4 || 43 || 4.6 || 0.9 || 0.2 || 1.7 || align=center|
|-
|align="left"| || align="center"|G || align="left"|DePaul || align="center"|5 ||  align="center"|– || 304 || 10,857 || 1,316 || 2,712 || 4,719 || 35.7 || 4.3 || 8.9 || 15.5 || align=center|
|-
|align="left"| || align="center"|F || align="left"|Jacksonville || align="center"|1 ||  align="center"| || 1 || 4 || 0 || 0 || 2 || 4.0 || 0.0 || 0.0 || 2.0 || align=center|
|-
|align="left"| || align="center"|F || align="left"|Xavier || align="center"|1 ||  align="center"| || 1 || 12 || 5 || 1 || 3 || 12.0 || 5.0 || 1.0 || 3.0 || align=center|
|}

T to U
|-
|align="left"| || align="center"|G || align="left"|UAB || align="center"|2 ||  align="center"|– || 98 || 834 || 106 || 90 || 266 || 8.5 || 1.1 || 0.9 || 2.7 || align=center|
|-
|align="left"| || align="center"|G || align="left"|LSU || align="center"|4 ||  align="center"|– || 258 || 4,480 || 493 || 383 || 1,186 || 17.4 || 1.9 || 1.5 || 4.6 || align=center|
|-
|align="left"| || align="center"|G/F || align="left"|Winston-Salem State || align="center"|3 ||  align="center"|– || 94 || 1,078 || 227 || 124 || 285 || 11.5 || 2.4 || 1.3 || 3.0 || align=center|
|-
|align="left"| || align="center"|G || align="left"|Kansas || align="center"|1 ||  align="center"| || 17 || 131 || 14 || 9 || 38 || 7.7 || 0.8 || 0.5 || 2.2 || align=center|
|-
|align="left"| || align="center"|F || align="left"|Syracuse || align="center"|7 ||  align="center"|– || 373 || 6,681 || 1,840 || 146 || 2,234 || 17.9 || 4.9 || 0.4 || 6.0 || align=center|
|-
|align="left" bgcolor="#FFFF99"|^ || align="center"|G || align="left"|West Virginia || align="center"|1 ||  align="center"| || 75 || 2,594 || 360 || 281 || 1,080 || 34.6 || 4.8 || 3.7 || 14.4 || align=center|
|-
|align="left"| || align="center"|F || align="left"|Florida State || align="center"|2 ||  align="center"|– || 73 || 1,743 || 258 || 80 || 649 || 23.9 || 3.5 || 1.1 || 8.9 || align=center|
|-
|align="left"| || align="center"|F/C || align="left"|UC Irvine || align="center"|1 ||  align="center"| || 7 || 31 || 12 || 0 || 3 || 4.4 || 1.7 || 0.0 || 0.4 || align=center|
|-
|align="left"| || align="center"|G || align="left"|LSU || align="center"|2 ||  align="center"|– || 47 || 799 || 111 || 60 || 337 || 17.0 || 2.4 || 1.3 || 7.2 || align=center|
|-
|align="left"| || align="center"|F/C || align="left"|Providence || align="center"|1 ||  align="center"| || 49 || 1,539 || 334 || 101 || 554 || 31.4 || 6.8 || 2.1 || 11.3 || align=center|
|-
|align="left"| || align="center"|F/C || align="left"|Seattle || align="center"|3 ||  align="center"|– || 187 || 3,219 || 838 || 192 || 1,163 || 17.2 || 4.5 || 1.0 || 6.2 || align=center|
|-
|align="left"| || align="center"|F || align="left"|Oklahoma Baptist || align="center"|2 ||  align="center"|– || 59 || 538 || 126 || 14 || 260 || 9.1 || 2.1 || 0.2 || 4.4 || align=center|
|-
|align="left"| || align="center"|F || align="left"|Wake Forest || align="center"|1 ||  align="center"| || 62 || 982 || 170 || 68 || 243 || 15.8 || 2.7 || 1.1 || 3.9 || align=center|
|-
|align="left"| || align="center"|F || align="left"|Gonzaga || align="center"|1 ||  align="center"| || 4 || 58 || 12 || 5 || 6 || 14.5 || 3.0 || 1.3 || 1.5 || align=center|
|-
|align="left"| || align="center"|G || align="left"|Memphis || align="center"|1 ||  align="center"| || 70 || 871 || 90 || 177 || 284 || 12.4 || 1.3 || 2.5 || 4.1 || align=center|
|-
|align="left"| || align="center"|G/F || align="left"|Louisville || align="center"|1 ||  align="center"| || 42 || 567 || 85 || 44 || 200 || 13.5 || 2.0 || 1.0 || 4.8 || align=center|
|-
|align="left"| || align="center"|C || align="left"|Kentucky || align="center"|1 ||  align="center"| || 59 || 818 || 221 || 27 || 276 || 13.9 || 3.7 || 0.5 || 4.7 || align=center|
|-
|align="left"| || align="center"|F/C || align="left"|Louisville || align="center"|1 ||  align="center"| || 78 || 1,606 || 610 || 86 || 519 || 20.6 || 7.8 || 1.1 || 6.7 || align=center|
|-
|align="left"| || align="center"|G || align="left"|Siena || align="center"|1 ||  align="center"| || 4 || 52 || 10 || 1 || 14 || 13.0 || 2.5 || 0.3 || 3.5 || align=center|
|-
|align="left" bgcolor="#FFFF99"|^ (#41) || align="center"|F/C || align="left"|Louisville || align="center" bgcolor="#CFECEC"|13 ||  align="center"|– || bgcolor="#CFECEC"|984 || bgcolor="#CFECEC"|35,832 || bgcolor="#CFECEC"|13,769 || 3,822 || 10,624 || 36.4 || 14.0 || 3.9 || 10.8 || align=center|
|}

V to Z
|-
|align="left"| || align="center"|G || align="left"|St. Bonaventure || align="center"|1 ||  align="center"| || 22 || 411 || 37 || 66 || 122 || 18.7 || 1.7 || 3.0 || 5.5 || align=center|
|-
|align="left"| || align="center"|F || align="left"|Michigan || align="center"|1 ||  align="center"| || 14 || 157 || 50 || 7 || 54 || 11.2 || 3.6 || 0.5 || 3.9 || align=center|
|-
|align="left"| || align="center"|F || align="left"|Czech Republic || align="center"|3 ||  align="center"|– || 141 || 2,149 || 484 || 85 || 497 || 15.2 || 3.4 || 0.6 || 3.5 || align=center|
|-
|align="left"| || align="center"|F || align="left"|Michigan State || align="center"|1 ||  align="center"| || 51 || 1,386 || 210 || 85 || 678 || 27.2 || 4.1 || 1.7 || 13.3 || align=center|
|-
|align="left"| || align="center"|G || align="left"|Arkansas || align="center"|4 ||  align="center"|– || 283 || 8,693 || 1,846 || 1,707 || 2,349 || 30.7 || 6.5 || 6.0 || 8.3 || align=center|
|-
|align="left"| || align="center"|F || align="left"|Michigan State || align="center"|1 ||  align="center"| || 65 || 1,331 || 466 || 69 || 438 || 20.5 || 7.2 || 1.1 || 6.7 || align=center|
|-
|align="left"| || align="center"|F || align="left"|Kentucky || align="center"|2 ||  align="center"|– || 97 || 1,663 || 336 || 40 || 408 || 17.1 || 3.5 || 0.4 || 4.2 || align=center|
|-
|align="left"| || align="center"|G || align="left"|Millersville || align="center"|1 ||  align="center"| || 40 || 384 || 52 || 54 || 178 || 9.6 || 1.3 || 1.4 || 4.5 || align=center|
|-
|align="left"| || align="center"|F || align="left"|Louisville || align="center"|1 ||  align="center"| || 14 || 134 || 18 || 4 || 24 || 9.6 || 1.3 || 0.3 || 1.7 || align=center|
|-
|align="left" bgcolor="#FBCEB1"|* || align="center"|G || align="left"|Kentucky || align="center"|9 ||  align="center"|– || 573 || 20,545 || 2,483 || bgcolor="#CFECEC"|5,282 || 10,879 || 35.9 || 4.3 || bgcolor="#CFECEC"|9.2 || 19.0 || align=center|
|-
|align="left"| || align="center"|F/C || align="left"|Virginia Union || align="center"|3 ||  align="center"|– || 147 || 2,552 || 766 || 38 || 520 || 17.4 || 5.2 || 0.3 || 3.5 || align=center|
|-
|align="left"| || align="center"|F/C || align="left"|North Carolina || align="center"|1 ||  align="center"| || 65 || 1,788 || 303 || 85 || 655 || 27.5 || 4.7 || 1.3 || 10.1 || align=center|
|-
|align="left"| || align="center"|G/F || align="left"|Tennessee State || align="center"|2 ||  align="center"|– || 118 || 1,804 || 540 || 76 || 678 || 15.3 || 4.6 || 0.6 || 5.7 || align=center|
|-
|align="left"| || align="center"|G || align="left"|Saint Joseph's || align="center"|2 ||  align="center"|– || 75 || 981 || 91 || 169 || 235 || 13.1 || 1.2 || 2.3 || 3.1 || align=center|
|-
|align="left"| || align="center"|G || align="left"|San Diego || align="center"|1 ||  align="center"| || 1 || 4 || 0 || 0 || 0 || 4.0 || 0.0 || 0.0 || 0.0 || align=center|
|-
|align="left"| || align="center"|F || align="left"|Illinois || align="center"|4 ||  align="center"|– || 222 || 3,798 || 1,041 || 146 || 1,700 || 17.1 || 4.7 || 0.7 || 7.7 || align=center|
|-
|align="left" bgcolor="#FFCC00"|+ || align="center"|F/C || align="left"|Michigan || align="center"|4 ||  align="center"|– || 212 || 8,240 || 2,049 || 935 || 4,441 || 38.9 || 9.7 || 4.4 || 20.9 || align=center|
|-
|align="left"| || align="center"|F || align="left"|Oklahoma || align="center"|1 ||  align="center"| || 11 || 58 || 7 || 3 || 18 || 5.3 || 0.6 || 0.3 || 1.6 || align=center|
|-
|align="left"| || align="center"|G/F || align="left"|Seattle Prep. (WA) || align="center"|3 ||  align="center"|– || 186 || 4,709 || 562 || 257 || 1,734 || 25.3 || 3.0 || 1.4 || 9.3 || align=center|
|-
|align="left"| || align="center"|G || align="left"|Penn State || align="center"|1 ||  align="center"| || 62 || 768 || 69 || 130 || 153 || 12.4 || 1.1 || 2.1 || 2.5 || align=center|
|-
|align="left"| || align="center"|G || align="left"|Northwestern || align="center"|1 ||  align="center"| || 3 || 48 || 6 || 7 || 2 || 16.0 || 2.0 || 2.3 || 0.7 || align=center|
|-
|align="left"| || align="center"|C || align="left"|Kansas || align="center"|1 ||  align="center"| || 39 || 400 || 136 || 14 || 168 || 10.3 || 3.5 || 0.4 || 4.3 || align=center|
|-
|align="left"| || align="center"|G || align="left"|Cincinnati || align="center"|1 ||  align="center"| || 4 || 14 || 5 || 0 || 4 || 3.5 || 1.3 || 0.0 || 1.0 || align=center|
|-
|align="left"| || align="center"|G || align="left"|Alabama || align="center"|2 ||  align="center"|– || 77 || 1,843 || 201 || 399 || 629 || 23.9 || 2.6 || 5.2 || 8.2 || align=center|
|-
|align="left"| || align="center"|F/C || align="left"|Georgetown || align="center"|6 ||  align="center"|– || 256 || 4,917 || 1,649 || 55 || 1,651 || 19.2 || 6.4 || 0.2 || 6.4 || align=center|
|-
|align="left"| || align="center"|F || align="left"|Florida State || align="center"|1 ||  align="center"| || 3 || 6 || 2 || 0 || 0 || 2.0 || 0.7 || 0.0 || 0.0 || align=center|
|-
|align="left"| || align="center"|G || align="left"|Clemson || align="center"|8 ||  align="center"|– || 463 || 8,482 || 706 || 1,387 || 3,269 || 18.3 || 1.5 || 3.0 || 7.1 || align=center|
|-
|align="left"| || align="center"|G || align="left"|Rice || align="center"|1 ||  align="center"| || 4 || 44 || 6 || 3 || 5 || 11.0 || 1.5 || 0.8 || 1.3 || align=center|
|-
|align="left"| || align="center"|F/C || align="left"|Xavier || align="center"|1 ||  align="center"| || 81 || 1,545 || 409 || 58 || 616 || 19.1 || 5.0 || 0.7 || 7.6 || align=center|
|-
|align="left"| || align="center"|G/F || align="left"|Portland State || align="center"|1 ||  align="center"| || 9 || 110 || 12 || 7 || 69 || 12.2 || 1.3 || 0.8 || 7.7 || align=center|
|-
|align="left"| || align="center"|G || align="left"|USC || align="center"|2 ||  align="center"|– || 156 || 5,244 || 361 || 1,061 || 2,614 || 33.6 || 2.3 || 6.8 || 16.8 || align=center|
|-
|align="left"| || align="center"|F || align="left"|Washington State || align="center"|1 ||  align="center"| || 21 || 119 || 27 || 9 || 61 || 5.7 || 1.3 || 0.4 || 2.9 || align=center|
|-
|align="left"| || align="center"|F/C || align="left"|LSU || align="center"|5 ||  align="center"|– || 293 || 8,187 || 1,696 || 996 || 3,623 || 27.9 || 5.8 || 3.4 || 12.4 || align=center|
|-
|align="left"| || align="center"|F/C || align="left"|Stetson || align="center"|3 || align="center"|– || 41 || 451 || 120 || 8 || 85 || 11.0 || 2.9 || 0.2 || 2.1 || align=center|
|-
|align="left"| || align="center"|G || align="left"|New Mexico State || align="center"|2 ||  align="center"|– || 39 || 715 || 52 || 56 || 391 || 18.3 || 1.3 || 1.4 || 10.0 || align=center|
|-
|align="left"| || align="center"|G || align="left"|Marquette || align="center"|1 ||  align="center"| || 6 || 26 || 1 || 3 || 1 || 4.3 || 0.2 || 0.5 || 0.2 || align=center|
|-
|align="left"| || align="center"|G/F || align="left"|Georgetown || align="center"|1 ||  align="center"| || 81 || 2,127 || 269 || 247 || 638 || 26.3 || 3.3 || 3.0 || 7.9 || align=center|
|-
|align="left"| || align="center"|G/F || align="left"|Holy Cross || align="center"|1 ||  align="center"| || 46 || 493 || 62 || 38 || 132 || 10.7 || 1.3 || 0.8 || 2.9 || align=center|
|-
|align="left"| || align="center"|G || align="left"|Cal State Fullerton || align="center"|1 ||  align="center"| || 39 || 743 || 63 || 107 || 378 || 19.1 || 1.6 || 2.7 || 9.7 || align=center|
|-
|align="left"| || align="center"|G || align="left"|Oral Roberts || align="center"|1 ||  align="center"| || 73 || 2,034 || 242 || 353 || 581 || 27.9 || 3.3 || 4.8 || 8.0 || align=center|
|-
|align="left"| || align="center"|F/C || align="left"|Seattle || align="center"|2 ||  align="center"|– || 22 || 96 || 28 || 2 || 54 || 4.4 || 1.3 || 0.1 || 2.5 || align=center|
|-
|align="left"| || align="center"|G || align="left"|Grambling State || align="center"|4 ||  align="center"|– || 297 || 5,831 || 462 || 1,012 || 2,489 || 19.6 || 1.6 || 3.4 || 8.4 || align=center|
|-
|align="left"|Yi Jianlian || align="center"|F || align="left"|China || align="center"|1 ||  align="center"| || 63 || 1,112 || 248 || 25 || 355 || 17.7 || 3.9 || 0.4 || 5.6 || align=center|
|-
|align="left"| || align="center"|G/F || align="left"|USC || align="center"|5 ||  align="center"|– || 335 || 7,661 || 638 || 327 || 3,872 || 22.9 || 1.9 || 1.0 || 11.6 || align=center|
|-
|align="left"| || align="center"|G || align="left"|Drake || align="center"|2 ||  align="center"|– || 78 || 697 || 92 || 37 || 271 || 8.9 || 1.2 || 0.5 || 3.5 || align=center|
|}

Assistant coaches

Randy Ayers
Johnny Bach
Gene Banks
Bill Berry
Mike Brown
Sam Cassell
Larry Drew
Patrick Ewing
Brian James
Don Newman
Mike O'Koren
Ryan Saunders
Randy Wittman
Tom Young
Don Zierden

Head coaches
Jim Brovelli
Doug Collins
Leonard Hamilton
Gar Heard
Eddie Jordan
Flip Saunders
Ed Tapscott
Darrell Walker
Randy Wittman
Scott Brooks
Wes Unseld Jr

See also
List of Baltimore Bullets (1944–54) players

References
 

National Basketball Association all-time rosters

Roster